This is a list of notable 8-bit computer color palettes, and graphics, which were primarily manufactured from 1975 to 1985. Although some of them use RGB palettes, more commonly they have 4, 16 or more color palettes that are not bit nor level combinations of RGB primaries, but fixed ROM/circuitry colors selected by the manufacturer. Due to mixed-bit architectures, the n-bit distinction is not always a strict categorization. Another error is assuming that a computer's color palette represents what it can show all at once. Resolution is also a crucial aspect when criticizing an 8-bit computer, as many offer different modes with different amounts of colors on screen, and different resolutions, with the intent of trading off resolution for color, and vice versa.

{|
| Sample image
| Color test chart
| 3-bit, 8-color palette
| 6-bit, 64-color palette
|-
| 
| 
| 
| 
|}

3-bit RGB palettes

Systems with a 3-bit RGB palette use 1 bit for each of the red, green and blue color components. That is, each component is either "on" or "off" with no intermediate states. This results in an 8-color palette ((21)3 == 23 == 8) that have black, white, the three RGB primary colors red, green and blue and their correspondent complementary colors cyan, magenta and yellow as follows:

{|
|Sample image
|Palette coverage 
|Color indexes 
|-
| 
| 
| 
|}

The color indices vary between implementations; therefore, index numbers are not given. A common selection has 3 bits (from LSB to MSB) directly representing the 'Red', 'Green' and 'Blue' (RGB) components in a number from 0 to 7. An alternate arrangement uses the bit order 'Blue', 'Red', 'Green' (BRG), such that the resultant palette - in numerical order - represents an increasing level of intensity on a monochrome display.

The 3-bit RGB palette is used by:

The ECMA-48 standard for text terminals (sometimes known as the "ANSI standard", although ANSI X3.64 does not define colors)
Teletext Level 1/1.5 Teletext.
Videotex
Oric
BBC Micro
The original NEC PC-8801 up to the MkII
The original NEC PC-9801 with original 8086 CPU before the VM/VX models
All Sharp X1 models before the X1 Turbo Z
The Sharp MZ 700
Fujitsu FM-7, FM New 7, FM 77 before the FM77AV
Sinclair QL
The Macintosh SE with a color printer or external monitor
The SECAM version of the Atari 2600
The Color Maximite, a PIC32 based microcomputer
The Thomson TO7 (with spatial constraints - only 2 colours for each group of 8x1 pixels)
The  Matra Alice 32 and 90 
The Philips VG5000

Specific details about implementation and actual graphical capabilities of specific systems, are listed on the next sub-sections.

World System Teletext Level 1

World System Teletext Level 1 (1976) uses a 3-bit RGB, 8-color palette. Teletext has 40×25 characters per page of which the first row is reserved for a page header. Every character cell has a background color and a text color. These attributes along with others are set through control codes which each occupy one character position. Graphics characters consisting of 2×3 cells can used following a graphics color attribute. Up to a maximum of 72×69 blocky pixels can be used on a page.

Simulated image

BBC Micro

BBC Micro has 8 display modes, with resolutions like 640×256 (max. 2 colors), 320×256 (max. 4 colors) and 160×256 (max. 16 logical colors). No display modes have cell attribute clashes. The palette available has only 8 physical colors, plus a further 8 flashing colors (each being one of the eight non-flashing colors alternating with its physical complement every second), and the display modes can have 16, 4 or 2 simultaneous colors.

Simulated image

BBC Micro display modes

{|
| Mode 0 (640 × 256, 2 colors)
| Mode 1 (320 × 256, 4 colors)
| Mode 2 (160 × 256, 8 colors)
|-
|
|
|
|}
{|
| Mode 4 (320 × 256, 2 colors)
| Mode 5 (160 × 256, 4 colors)
| Mode 8 (80 × 256, 8 colors)
|-
|
|
|
|}

Sinclair QL (Sinclair Quantum Leap)

On the Sinclair QL two video modes were available, 256×256 pixels with 8 RGB colors and per-pixel flashing, or 512×256 pixels with four colors: black, red, green and white. The supported colors could be stippled in 2×2 blocks to simulate up to 256 colors, an effect which did not copy reliably on a TV, especially over an RF connection. 
Pixel aspect ratio was not square, with resulting image proportions close to 4.4:3, making the image extend into the horizontal overscan area of a CRT TV.

{|
| 256x256 mode
| 512x256 mode
|-
| 
| 
|-
| Simulated images (aspect ratio corrected)
| 
|-
|  
| 
|-
| Simulated images (original pixel size)
| 
|-
|  
| 
|}

{|class="wikitable" style="width: 20pc"
! style="color:black; background:white;"| 256×256
! style="color:black; background:white;"| 512×256
|-
| style="color:white; background:#000000;"| black
| style="color:white; background:#000000;" rowspan="2"| black
|-
| style="color:white; background:#0000ff;"| blue
|-
| style="color:white; background:#ff0000;"| red
| style="color:white; background:#ff0000;" rowspan="2" | red
|-
| style="color:white; background:#ff00ff;"| magenta
|-
| style="color:white; background:#00ff00;"| green
| style="color:white; background:#00ff00;" rowspan="2"| green
|-
| style="color:black; background:#00ffff;"| cyan
|-
| style="color:black; background:#ffff00;"| yellow
| style="color:black; background:#ffffff;" rowspan="2"| white
|-
| style="color:black; background:#ffffff;"| white
|}

PC-8000 series
The NEC PC-8000 was capable of displaying graphics with a resolution of 160x100 pixels and 8 colors.

4-bit RGBI palettes
{|
| 
| 
|}
The 4-bit RGBI palette is similar to the 3-bit RGB palette but adds one bit for intensity. This allows each of the colors of the 3-bit palette to have a variant (on most machines dark or bright, but saturated or unsaturated was also possible) potentially giving a total of 23×2 == 16 colors. Some implementations had only 15 effective colors due to the "dark" and "bright" variations of black being displayed identically. Others generated a grey tone or a different color.

This 4-bit RGBI schema is used in several platforms with variations, so the table given below is a simple reference for the palette richness, and not an actual implemented palette. For this reason, no numbers are assigned to each color, and color order is arbitrary.

Systems that used this palette scheme:
 IBM's original Color Graphics Adapter
 IBM's Enhanced Graphics Adapter, in CGA modes
 Tandy graphics on IBM's PCjr and Tandy 1000-series computers
 Plantronics Colorplus on a limited number of PC-compatible computers
 MCGA and VGA graphics standards for backward compatibility
 Commodore 128 series for its 80-column mode
 ZX Spectrum (and compatible) (with spatial constraints - only 2 colours for each group of 8x8 pixels)
 CPC 464/664/6128
 Sharp MZ-800 series computers
 Thomson MO5 and TO7 (with spatial constraints - only 2 colours for each group of 8x1 pixels)

Specific details about implementation and actual graphical capabilities of specific systems, are listed on the next sub-sections.

ZX Spectrum

The ZX Spectrum (and compatible) computers use a variation of the 4-bit RGBI palette philosophy. This results in each of the colors of the 3-bit palette to have a basic and bright variant, with the exception of black. This was accomplished by having a maximum voltage level for the bright variant, and a lower voltage level for the basic variant. Due to this, black is the same in both variants.

The attribute byte associated with every 8×8 pixel cell comprises (from LSB to MSB): three bits for the background color; three bits for the foreground color; one bit for the bright variant for both, and one bit for the flashing effect (alternate foreground and background colors every 0.32 seconds). Thus the colors are not independently selectable as indices of a true palette (there are not color numbers 8 to 15, and the bright bit affects both colors within a cell). However, within a single set of 8 colors the BRG order of bits means that the colors appear in increasing order of brightness on a monochrome display.

The color number (0 to 7) can be employed with the following BASIC statements to choose:

 BORDER n, the color for the surrounding area outside the pixel graphical area. This cannot use the bright variants.
 PAPER n, the background (pixel bit value of 0) color for an 8×8 pixel cell.
 INK n, the foreground (pixel bit value of 1) color for an 8×8 pixel cell.

And a value of 0 or 1 with the following statements to choose:

 BRIGHT n, sets the bright bit for both foreground and background colors in an 8×8 pixel cell.
 FLASH n, sets the bit that controls the flashing effect in an 8×8 pixel cell.

{|
| Simulated image
| colspan="3"|Sample image and palette
| 
|
|-
| 
| 
| 
| style="vertical-align:top;" | 
|}

 Some ZX Spectrum clones or NTSC machines might display "bright black" as dark gray.
 Colours simulated as sRGB assume non-bright as 85% voltage (0.55 V) and bright as 100% (0.65 V). Each ZX Spectrum model used different voltages, so the colors shown are only approximate.

IBM PC/XT and compatible systems

The original IBM PC launched in 1981 features an Intel 8088 CPU which has 8-bit data bus technology, though internally the CPU has a fully 16-bit architecture.  It was offered with a Monochrome Display Adapter (MDA) or a Color Graphics Adapter (CGA).  The MDA is a text mode-only display adapter, without any graphic ability beyond using the built-in code page 437 character set (which includes half-block and line-drawing characters), and employed an original IBM green monochrome monitor; only black, green and intensified green could be seen on its screen.  Then, only the CGA had true graphic modes.

The IBM PC XT model, which succeeded the original PC in 1983, has an identical architecture and CPU to its predecessor, only with more expansion slots and a hard disk equipped as standard.  The same two video cards, the MDA and the CGA, remained available for the PC XT, and no upgraded video hardware was offered by IBM until the EGA, which followed the introduction of the IBM Personal Computer/AT, with its full 16-bit bus design, in 1984.

CGA

The Color Graphics Adapter (CGA) outputs what IBM called "digital RGB" (that is, the R, G, B (and I) signals from the graphics card to the monitor can each only have two states: on or off). 

CGA supports a maximum of 16 colors. However, its 320×200 graphics mode is restricted to fixed palettes containing only four colors, and the 640×200 graphic mode is only two colors. 16 simultaneous colors are only available in text mode or the "tweaked text" 160×100 mode. 

A different set of 16 simultaneous colors is available using an NTSC TV or composite monitor  by using artifact color techniques, with independent groups having demonstrated much larger color sets of over 256 colors  See Color Graphics Adapter#High color depth.

The CGA RGBI palette is a variant of the 4-bit RGBI schema, arranged internally like this:. 

Although the RGBI signals each have only two states, the CGA color monitor (usually mentioned as RGB monitor) decodes them as four level RGB signals. Darker colors are the basic RGB 2nd level signals except for brown, which is dark yellow with the level for the green component halved (1st level). Brighter colors are made by adding a uniform intensity one-level signal to every RGB signal of the dark ones, reaching the 3rd level (except dark gray which reaches only the 1st level), and in this case yellow is produced as if the brown were ordinary dark yellow.

The resulting displayed colors on RGB monitors are shown below:

{|
| 
| 
| style="vertical-align:top;"| 
|}

{|class="wikitable" style="border-style: none" border="1" cellpadding="5"
|- style="color:white;"
| style="background:#000;"| 0 — black
| style="background:#555;"| 8 — high gray
|- style="color:white;"
| style="background:#00a;"| 1 — low blue
| style="background:#55f;"| 9 — high blue
|-
| style="color:white; background:#0a0;"| 2 — low green
| style="color:black; background:#5f5;"| 10 — high green
|-
| style="color:white; background:#0aa;"| 3 — low cyan
| style="color:black; background:#5ff;"| 11 — high cyan
|-
| style="color:white; background:#a00;"| 4 — low red
| style="color:black; background:#f55;"| 12 — high red
|-
| style="color:white; background:#a0a;"| 5 — low magenta
| style="color:black; background:#f5f;"| 13 — high magenta
|-
| style="color:white; background:#a50;"| 6 — low yellow (brown)
| style="color:black; background:#ff5;"| 14 — high yellow
|- style="color:black;"
| style="background:#aaa;"| 7 — low gray
| style="background:#fff;"| 15 — white
|}

A few earlier non-IBM compatible CGA monitors lack the circuitry to decode color numbers as of four levels internally, and they cannot show brown and dark gray. The above palette is displayed in such monitors as follows:

{|class="wikitable" style="border-style: none" border="1" cellpadding="5"
|- style="color:white; background:#000;"
|| 0 — black
|| 8 — black*
|- style="color:white;"
| style="background:navy;"| 1 — low blue
| style="background:#00f;"| 9 — high blue
|-
| style="color:white; background:green;"| 2 — low green
| style="color:black; background:#0f0;"| 10 — high green
|-
| style="color:white; background:teal;"| 3 — low cyan
| style="color:black; background:#0ff;"| 11 — high cyan
|-
| style="color:white; background:maroon;"| 4 — low red
| style="color:white; background:#f00;"| 12 — high red
|-
| style="color:white; background:purple;"| 5 — low magenta
| style="color:white; background:#f0f;"| 13 — high magenta
|-
| style="color:white; background:olive;"| 6 — low yellow* (brown)
| style="color:black; background:#ff0;"| 14 — high yellow
|-
| style="color:white; background:gray;"| 7 — light gray
| style="color:black; background:#fff;"| 15 — white
|}

16-color palette modes 
The only full 16-color BIOS modes of the CGA are the text mode 0 (40×25) and mode 2 (80×25). Disabling the flashing attribute effect and using the IBM 437 codepage block characters 220 (DCh) ▄ (bottom half) or 223 (DFh) ▀ (upper half), the mode 2 screen buffer provides an 80×50 quasi-graphic mode.

Also, a tweak mode can be set in the CGA to give an extra, non-standard 160×100 pixels 16-color graphic mode.

{|
| 16-color, 80×50 mode
| 16-color, 160×100 mode
| 16-color comparison image
|-
|
|
|
|}

4-color palette modes 
In the 320×200 graphics mode, every pixel has two bits. A value of 0 is always a selectable background-plus-border color (with the same register and/or BIOS call used for the foreground color in the 640×200 graphic mode; black by default), and the three remaining values 1 to 3 are indices to one of the predefined color palette entries.

The selection of a palette is a bit complex. There are two BIOS 320×200 CGA graphics modes: modes 4 and 5. Mode 4 has the composite color burst output enabled (in the Mode Control Register at I/O address 3D8H, bit 2 is cleared), and mode 5 has it disabled (the same bit 2 is set). Mode 5 is intended mainly for a monochrome composite video monitor, but because of a specific intentional feature of the CGA hardware, it also has a different palette for an RGBI color monitor. For mode 4, two palettes can be chosen: green/red/brown and cyan/magenta/white; the difference is the absence or presence of the blue signal in all three colors. (The palette is selected with bit 5 of the Color-Select Register at I/O address 3D9h, where the bit value 1 selects the cyan/magenta/white palette [a/k/a "palette #1" because it is the BIOS default] and 0 selects the green/red/brown palette [a/k/a "palette #2"]. This bit can be set using BIOS INT 10h function 0Bh, subfunction 1.) The palette for BIOS video mode 5 is always cyan/red/white: blue is always on, and red and green each are controlled directly by one of the two bits of the pixel color value.  For each of these three palette options, a low or high intensity palette can be chosen with bit 4 of the aforementioned Color-Select Register: a value of 0 means low intensity and 1 means high intensity. (No BIOS call exists to switch between the two intensity modes.) The selected intensity setting simply controls the "I" output signal to the RGBI monitor for all colors in the palette. As a result, the green-red-brown palette appears as bright-green/bright-red/yellow when high intensity is selected. The combination of color-burst enable/disable selection, palette selection, and intensity selection yields a total of 6 different possible palettes for CGA 320×200 graphics.

Mode 4, palette #1, low intensity: 
{| class="wikitable" style="border-style: none" border="1" cellpadding="5"
| style="color:white; background:#000;" | 0 — [user-defined]
|-
| style="color:white; background:#0aa;" | 1 — cyan
|-
| style="color:white; background:#a0a;" | 2 — magenta
|-
| style="color:black; background:#aaa;" | 3 — light grey
|}

The sixteen combinations with the background color are:
{| style="border-style: none" border="0" cellpadding="5"
|-
| style="color:white; background:#000;"| 0
| style="color:white; background:#0aa;"| 1
| style="color:white; background:#fff;"| _
| style="color:white; background:#00a;"| 0
| style="color:white; background:#0aa;"| 1
| style="color:white; background:#fff;"| _
| style="color:white; background:#0a0;"| 0
| style="color:white; background:#0aa;"| 1
| style="color:white; background:#fff;"| _
| style="color:white; background:#0aa;"| 0
| style="color:white; background:#0aa;"| 1
| style="color:black; background:#fff;"| *
| style="color:white; background:#a00;"| 0
| style="color:white; background:#0aa;"| 1
| style="color:white; background:#fff;"| _
| style="color:white; background:#a0a;"| 0
| style="color:white; background:#0aa;"| 1
| style="color:black; background:#fff;"| *
| style="color:white; background:#a50;"| 0
| style="color:white; background:#0aa;"| 1
| style="color:white; background:#fff;"| _
| style="color:black; background:#aaa;"| 0
| style="color:white; background:#0aa;"| 1
| style="color:black; background:#fff;"| *
|-
| style="color:white; background:#a0a;"| 2
| style="color:black; background:#aaa;"| 3
| style="color:white; background:#fff;"| _
| style="color:white; background:#a0a;"| 2
| style="color:black; background:#aaa;"| 3
| style="color:white; background:#fff;"| _
| style="color:white; background:#a0a;"| 2
| style="color:black; background:#aaa;"| 3
| style="color:white; background:#fff;"| _
| style="color:white; background:#a0a;"| 2
| style="color:black; background:#aaa;"| 3
| style="color:white; background:#fff;"| _
| style="color:white; background:#a0a;"| 2
| style="color:black; background:#aaa;"| 3
| style="color:white; background:#fff;"| _
| style="color:white; background:#a0a;"| 2
| style="color:black; background:#aaa;"| 3
| style="color:white; background:#fff;"| _
| style="color:white; background:#a0a;"| 2
| style="color:black; background:#aaa;"| 3
| style="color:white; background:#fff;"| _
| style="color:white; background:#a0a;"| 2
| style="color:black; background:#aaa;"| 3
| style="color:white; background:#fff;"| _
|}
{| style="border-style: none" border="0" cellpadding="5"
|-
| style="color:white; background:#555;"| 0
| style="color:white; background:#0aa;"| 1
| style="color:white; background:#fff;"| _
| style="color:white; background:#55f;"| 0
| style="color:white; background:#0aa;"| 1
| style="color:white; background:#fff;"| _
| style="color:black; background:#5f5;"| 0
| style="color:white; background:#0aa;"| 1
| style="color:white; background:#fff;"| _
| style="color:black; background:#5ff;"| 0
| style="color:white; background:#0aa;"| 1
| style="color:white; background:#fff;"| _
| style="color:black; background:#f55;"| 0
| style="color:white; background:#0aa;"| 1
| style="color:white; background:#fff;"| _
| style="color:black; background:#f5f;"| 0
| style="color:white; background:#0aa;"| 1
| style="color:white; background:#fff;"| _
| style="color:black; background:#ff5;"| 0
| style="color:white; background:#0aa;"| 1
| style="color:white; background:#fff;"| _
| style="color:black; background:#fff;"| 0
| style="color:white; background:#0aa;"| 1
| style="color:white; background:#fff;"| _
|-
| style="color:white; background:#a0a;"| 2
| style="color:black; background:#aaa;"| 3
| style="color:white; background:#fff;"| _
| style="color:white; background:#a0a;"| 2
| style="color:black; background:#aaa;"| 3
| style="color:white; background:#fff;"| _
| style="color:white; background:#a0a;"| 2
| style="color:black; background:#aaa;"| 3
| style="color:white; background:#fff;"| _
| style="color:white; background:#a0a;"| 2
| style="color:black; background:#aaa;"| 3
| style="color:white; background:#fff;"| _
| style="color:white; background:#a0a;"| 2
| style="color:black; background:#aaa;"| 3
| style="color:white; background:#fff;"| _
| style="color:white; background:#a0a;"| 2
| style="color:black; background:#aaa;"| 3
| style="color:white; background:#fff;"| _
| style="color:white; background:#a0a;"| 2
| style="color:black; background:#aaa;"| 3
| style="color:white; background:#fff;"| _
| style="color:white; background:#a0a;"| 2
| style="color:black; background:#aaa;"| 3
| style="color:white; background:#fff;"| _
|}

(*) Useless due to the duplication of one of the colors.

Mode 4, palette #1, high intensity: 
{| class="wikitable" style="border-style: none" border="1" cellpadding="5"
| style="color:white; background:#000;" | 0 — [user-defined]
|-
| style="color:black; background:#5ff;" | 1 — bright cyan
|-
| style="color:black; background:#f5f;" | 2 — bright magenta
|-
| style="color:black; background:#fff;" | 3 — bright white
|}

The sixteen combinations with the background color are:
{| style="border-style: none" border="0" cellpadding="5"
|-
| style="color:white; background:#000;"| 0
| style="color:black; background:#5ff;"| 1
| style="color:white; background:#fff;"| _
| style="color:white; background:#00a;"| 0
| style="color:black; background:#5ff;"| 1
| style="color:white; background:#fff;"| _
| style="color:white; background:#0a0;"| 0
| style="color:black; background:#5ff;"| 1
| style="color:white; background:#fff;"| _
| style="color:white; background:#0aa;"| 0
| style="color:black; background:#5ff;"| 1
| style="color:white; background:#fff;"| _
| style="color:white; background:#a00;"| 0
| style="color:black; background:#5ff;"| 1
| style="color:white; background:#fff;"| _
| style="color:white; background:#a0a;"| 0
| style="color:black; background:#5ff;"| 1
| style="color:white; background:#fff;"| _
| style="color:white; background:#a50;"| 0
| style="color:black; background:#5ff;"| 1
| style="color:white; background:#fff;"| _
| style="color:black; background:#aaa;"| 0
| style="color:black; background:#5ff;"| 1
| style="color:white; background:#fff;"| _
|-
| style="color:black; background:#f5f;"| 2
| style="color:black; background:#fff;"| 3
| style="color:white; background:#fff;"| _
| style="color:black; background:#f5f;"| 2
| style="color:black; background:#fff;"| 3
| style="color:white; background:#fff;"| _
| style="color:black; background:#f5f;"| 2
| style="color:black; background:#fff;"| 3
| style="color:white; background:#fff;"| _
| style="color:black; background:#f5f;"| 2
| style="color:black; background:#fff;"| 3
| style="color:white; background:#fff;"| _
| style="color:black; background:#f5f;"| 2
| style="color:black; background:#fff;"| 3
| style="color:white; background:#fff;"| _
| style="color:black; background:#f5f;"| 2
| style="color:black; background:#fff;"| 3
| style="color:white; background:#fff;"| _
| style="color:black; background:#f5f;"| 2
| style="color:black; background:#fff;"| 3
| style="color:white; background:#fff;"| _
| style="color:black; background:#f5f;"| 2
| style="color:black; background:#fff;"| 3
| style="color:white; background:#fff;"| _
|}
{| style="border-style: none" border="0" cellpadding="5"
|-
| style="color:white; background:#555;"| 0
| style="color:black; background:#5ff;"| 1
| style="color:white; background:#fff;"| _
| style="color:white; background:#55f;"| 0
| style="color:black; background:#5ff;"| 1
| style="color:white; background:#fff;"| _
| style="color:black; background:#5f5;"| 0
| style="color:black; background:#5ff;"| 1
| style="color:white; background:#fff;"| _
| style="color:black; background:#5ff;"| 0
| style="color:black; background:#5ff;"| 1
| style="color:black; background:#fff;"| *
| style="color:black; background:#f55;"| 0
| style="color:black; background:#5ff;"| 1
| style="color:white; background:#fff;"| _
| style="color:black; background:#f5f;"| 0
| style="color:black; background:#5ff;"| 1
| style="color:black; background:#fff;"| *
| style="color:black; background:#ff5;"| 0
| style="color:black; background:#5ff;"| 1
| style="color:white; background:#fff;"| _
| style="color:black; background:#fff;"| 0
| style="color:black; background:#5ff;"| 1
| style="color:black; background:#fff;"| *
|-
| style="color:black; background:#f5f;"| 2
| style="color:black; background:#fff;"| 3
| style="color:white; background:#fff;"| _
| style="color:black; background:#f5f;"| 2
| style="color:black; background:#fff;"| 3
| style="color:white; background:#fff;"| _
| style="color:black; background:#f5f;"| 2
| style="color:black; background:#fff;"| 3
| style="color:white; background:#fff;"| _
| style="color:black; background:#f5f;"| 2
| style="color:black; background:#fff;"| 3
| style="color:white; background:#fff;"| _
| style="color:black; background:#f5f;"| 2
| style="color:black; background:#fff;"| 3
| style="color:white; background:#fff;"| _
| style="color:black; background:#f5f;"| 2
| style="color:black; background:#fff;"| 3
| style="color:white; background:#fff;"| _
| style="color:black; background:#f5f;"| 2
| style="color:black; background:#fff;"| 3
| style="color:white; background:#fff;"| _
| style="color:black; background:#f5f;"| 2
| style="color:black; background:#fff;"| 3
| style="color:white; background:#fff;"| _
|}

(*) Useless due to the duplication of one of the colors.

Mode 4, palette #2, low intensity: 
{| class="wikitable" style="border-style: none" border="1" cellpadding="5"
| style="color:white; background:#000;" | 0 — [user-defined]
|-
| style="color:white; background:#0a0;" | 1 — green
|-
| style="color:white; background:#a00;" | 2 — red
|-
| style="color:white; background:#a50;" | 3 — brown
|}

The sixteen combinations with the background color are:
{| style="border-style: none" border="0" cellpadding="5"
|-
| style="color:white; background:#000;"| 0
| style="color:white; background:#0a0;"| 1
| style="color:white; background:#fff;"| _
| style="color:white; background:#00a;"| 0
| style="color:white; background:#0a0;"| 1
| style="color:white; background:#fff;"| _
| style="color:white; background:#0a0;"| 0
| style="color:white; background:#0a0;"| 1
| style="color:black; background:#fff;"| *
| style="color:white; background:#0aa;"| 0
| style="color:white; background:#0a0;"| 1
| style="color:white; background:#fff;"| _
| style="color:white; background:#a00;"| 0
| style="color:white; background:#0a0;"| 1
| style="color:black; background:#fff;"| *
| style="color:white; background:#a0a;"| 0
| style="color:white; background:#0a0;"| 1
| style="color:white; background:#fff;"| _
| style="color:white; background:#a50;"| 0
| style="color:white; background:#0a0;"| 1
| style="color:black; background:#fff;"| *
| style="color:black; background:#aaa;"| 0
| style="color:white; background:#0a0;"| 1
| style="color:white; background:#fff;"| _
|- style="color:white;"
| style="background:#a00;"| 2
| style="background:#a50;"| 3
| style="background:#fff;"| _
| style="background:#a00;"| 2
| style="background:#a50;"| 3
| style="background:#fff;"| _
| style="background:#a00;"| 2
| style="background:#a50;"| 3
| style="background:#fff;"| _
| style="background:#a00;"| 2
| style="background:#a50;"| 3
| style="background:#fff;"| _
| style="background:#a00;"| 2
| style="background:#a50;"| 3
| style="background:#fff;"| _
| style="background:#a00;"| 2
| style="background:#a50;"| 3
| style="background:#fff;"| _
| style="background:#a00;"| 2
| style="background:#a50;"| 3
| style="background:#fff;"| _
| style="background:#a00;"| 2
| style="background:#a50;"| 3
| style="background:#fff;"| _
|}
{| style="border-style: none" border="0" cellpadding="5"
|-
| style="color:white; background:#555;"| 0
| style="color:white; background:#0a0;"| 1
| style="color:white; background:#fff;"| _
| style="color:white; background:#55f;"| 0
| style="color:white; background:#0a0;"| 1
| style="color:white; background:#fff;"| _
| style="color:black; background:#5f5;"| 0
| style="color:white; background:#0a0;"| 1
| style="color:white; background:#fff;"| _
| style="color:black; background:#5ff;"| 0
| style="color:white; background:#0a0;"| 1
| style="color:white; background:#fff;"| _
| style="color:black; background:#f55;"| 0
| style="color:white; background:#0a0;"| 1
| style="color:white; background:#fff;"| _
| style="color:black; background:#f5f;"| 0
| style="color:white; background:#0a0;"| 1
| style="color:white; background:#fff;"| _
| style="color:black; background:#ff5;"| 0
| style="color:white; background:#0a0;"| 1
| style="color:white; background:#fff;"| _
| style="color:black; background:#fff;"| 0
| style="color:white; background:#0a0;"| 1
| style="color:white; background:#fff;"| _
|- style="color:white;"
| style="background:#a00;"| 2
| style="background:#a50;"| 3
| style="background:#fff;"| _
| style="background:#a00;"| 2
| style="background:#a50;"| 3
| style="background:#fff;"| _
| style="background:#a00;"| 2
| style="background:#a50;"| 3
| style="background:#fff;"| _
| style="background:#a00;"| 2
| style="background:#a50;"| 3
| style="background:#fff;"| _
| style="background:#a00;"| 2
| style="background:#a50;"| 3
| style="background:#fff;"| _
| style="background:#a00;"| 2
| style="background:#a50;"| 3
| style="background:#fff;"| _
| style="background:#a00;"| 2
| style="background:#a50;"| 3
| style="background:#fff;"| _
| style="background:#a00;"| 2
| style="background:#a50;"| 3
| style="background:#fff;"| _
|}

(*) Useless due to the duplication of one of the colors.

Mode 4, palette #2, high intensity: 
{| class="wikitable" style="border-style: none" border="1" cellpadding="5"
| style="color:white; background:#000;" | 0 — [user-defined]
|-
| style="color:black; background:#5f5;" | 1 — bright green
|-
| style="color:black; background:#f55;" | 2 — bright red
|-
| style="color:black; background:#ff5;" | 3 — yellow
|}

The sixteen combinations with the background color are:
{| style="border-style: none" border="0" cellpadding="5"
|-
| style="color:white; background:#000;"| 0
| style="color:black; background:#5f5;"| 1
| style="color:white; background:#fff;"| _
| style="color:white; background:#00a;"| 0
| style="color:black; background:#5f5;"| 1
| style="color:white; background:#fff;"| _
| style="color:white; background:#0a0;"| 0
| style="color:black; background:#5f5;"| 1
| style="color:white; background:#fff;"| _
| style="color:white; background:#0aa;"| 0
| style="color:black; background:#5f5;"| 1
| style="color:white; background:#fff;"| _
| style="color:white; background:#a00;"| 0
| style="color:black; background:#5f5;"| 1
| style="color:white; background:#fff;"| _
| style="color:white; background:#a0a;"| 0
| style="color:black; background:#5f5;"| 1
| style="color:white; background:#fff;"| _
| style="color:white; background:#a50;"| 0
| style="color:black; background:#5f5;"| 1
| style="color:white; background:#fff;"| _
| style="color:black; background:#aaa;"| 0
| style="color:black; background:#5f5;"| 1
| style="color:white; background:#fff;"| _
|-
| style="color:black; background:#f55;"| 2
| style="color:black; background:#ff5;"| 3
| style="color:white; background:#fff;"| _
| style="color:black; background:#f55;"| 2
| style="color:black; background:#ff5;"| 3
| style="color:white; background:#fff;"| _
| style="color:black; background:#f55;"| 2
| style="color:black; background:#ff5;"| 3
| style="color:white; background:#fff;"| _
| style="color:black; background:#f55;"| 2
| style="color:black; background:#ff5;"| 3
| style="color:white; background:#fff;"| _
| style="color:black; background:#f55;"| 2
| style="color:black; background:#ff5;"| 3
| style="color:white; background:#fff;"| _
| style="color:black; background:#f55;"| 2
| style="color:black; background:#ff5;"| 3
| style="color:white; background:#fff;"| _
| style="color:black; background:#f55;"| 2
| style="color:black; background:#ff5;"| 3
| style="color:white; background:#fff;"| _
| style="color:black; background:#f55;"| 2
| style="color:black; background:#ff5;"| 3
| style="color:white; background:#fff;"| _
|}
{| style="border-style: none" border="0" cellpadding="5"
|-
| style="color:white; background:#555;"| 0
| style="color:black; background:#5f5;"| 1
| style="color:white; background:#fff;"| _
| style="color:white; background:#55f;"| 0
| style="color:black; background:#5f5;"| 1
| style="color:white; background:#fff;"| _
| style="color:black; background:#5f5;"| 0
| style="color:black; background:#5f5;"| 1
| style="color:black; background:#fff;"| *
| style="color:black; background:#5ff;"| 0
| style="color:black; background:#5f5;"| 1
| style="color:white; background:#fff;"| _
| style="color:black; background:#f55;"| 0
| style="color:black; background:#5f5;"| 1
| style="color:black; background:#fff;"| *
| style="color:black; background:#f5f;"| 0
| style="color:black; background:#5f5;"| 1
| style="color:white; background:#fff;"| _
| style="color:black; background:#ff5;"| 0
| style="color:black; background:#5f5;"| 1
| style="color:black; background:#fff;"| *
| style="color:black; background:#fff;"| 0
| style="color:black; background:#5f5;"| 1
| style="color:white; background:#fff;"| _
|-
| style="color:black; background:#f55;"| 2
| style="color:black; background:#ff5;"| 3
| style="color:white; background:#fff;"| _
| style="color:black; background:#f55;"| 2
| style="color:black; background:#ff5;"| 3
| style="color:white; background:#fff;"| _
| style="color:black; background:#f55;"| 2
| style="color:black; background:#ff5;"| 3
| style="color:white; background:#fff;"| _
| style="color:black; background:#f55;"| 2
| style="color:black; background:#ff5;"| 3
| style="color:white; background:#fff;"| _
| style="color:black; background:#f55;"| 2
| style="color:black; background:#ff5;"| 3
| style="color:white; background:#fff;"| _
| style="color:black; background:#f55;"| 2
| style="color:black; background:#ff5;"| 3
| style="color:white; background:#fff;"| _
| style="color:black; background:#f55;"| 2
| style="color:black; background:#ff5;"| 3
| style="color:white; background:#fff;"| _
| style="color:black; background:#f55;"| 2
| style="color:black; background:#ff5;"| 3
| style="color:white; background:#fff;"| _
|}

(*) Useless due to the duplication of one of the colors.

Mode 5, low intensity: 
{| class="wikitable" style="border-style: none" border="1" cellpadding="5"
| style="color:white; background:#000;" | 0 — [user-defined]
|-
| style="color:white; background:#0aa;" | 1 — cyan
|-
| style="color:white; background:#a00;" | 2 — red
|-
| style="color:black; background:#aaa;" | 3 — light grey
|}

The sixteen combinations with the background color are:
{| style="border-style: none" border="0" cellpadding="5"
|-
| style="color:white; background:#000;"| 0
| style="color:white; background:#0aa;"| 1
| style="color:white; background:#fff;"| _
| style="color:white; background:#00a;"| 0
| style="color:white; background:#0aa;"| 1
| style="color:white; background:#fff;"| _
| style="color:white; background:#0a0;"| 0
| style="color:white; background:#0aa;"| 1
| style="color:white; background:#fff;"| _
| style="color:white; background:#0aa;"| 0
| style="color:white; background:#0aa;"| 1
| style="color:black; background:#fff;"| *
| style="color:white; background:#a00;"| 0
| style="color:white; background:#0aa;"| 1
| style="color:black; background:#fff;"| *
| style="color:white; background:#a0a;"| 0
| style="color:white; background:#0aa;"| 1
| style="color:white; background:#fff;"| _
| style="color:white; background:#a50;"| 0
| style="color:white; background:#0aa;"| 1
| style="color:white; background:#fff;"| _
| style="color:black; background:#aaa;"| 0
| style="color:white; background:#0aa;"| 1
| style="color:black; background:#fff;"| *
|-
| style="color:white; background:#a00;"| 2
| style="color:black; background:#aaa;"| 3
| style="color:white; background:#fff;"| _
| style="color:white; background:#a00;"| 2
| style="color:black; background:#aaa;"| 3
| style="color:white; background:#fff;"| _
| style="color:white; background:#a00;"| 2
| style="color:black; background:#aaa;"| 3
| style="color:white; background:#fff;"| _
| style="color:white; background:#a00;"| 2
| style="color:black; background:#aaa;"| 3
| style="color:white; background:#fff;"| _
| style="color:white; background:#a00;"| 2
| style="color:black; background:#aaa;"| 3
| style="color:white; background:#fff;"| _
| style="color:white; background:#a00;"| 2
| style="color:black; background:#aaa;"| 3
| style="color:white; background:#fff;"| _
| style="color:white; background:#a00;"| 2
| style="color:black; background:#aaa;"| 3
| style="color:white; background:#fff;"| _
| style="color:white; background:#a00;"| 2
| style="color:black; background:#aaa;"| 3
| style="color:white; background:#fff;"| _
|}
{| style="border-style: none" border="0" cellpadding="5"
|-
| style="color:white; background:#555;"| 0
| style="color:white; background:#0aa;"| 1
| style="color:white; background:#fff;"| _
| style="color:white; background:#55f;"| 0
| style="color:white; background:#0aa;"| 1
| style="color:white; background:#fff;"| _
| style="color:black; background:#5f5;"| 0
| style="color:white; background:#0aa;"| 1
| style="color:white; background:#fff;"| _
| style="color:black; background:#5ff;"| 0
| style="color:white; background:#0aa;"| 1
| style="color:white; background:#fff;"| _
| style="color:black; background:#f55;"| 0
| style="color:white; background:#0aa;"| 1
| style="color:white; background:#fff;"| _
| style="color:black; background:#f5f;"| 0
| style="color:white; background:#0aa;"| 1
| style="color:white; background:#fff;"| _
| style="color:black; background:#ff5;"| 0
| style="color:white; background:#0aa;"| 1
| style="color:white; background:#fff;"| _
| style="color:black; background:#fff;"| 0
| style="color:white; background:#0aa;"| 1
| style="color:white; background:#fff;"| _
|-
| style="color:white; background:#a00;"| 2
| style="color:black; background:#aaa;"| 3
| style="color:white; background:#fff;"| _
| style="color:white; background:#a00;"| 2
| style="color:black; background:#aaa;"| 3
| style="color:white; background:#fff;"| _
| style="color:white; background:#a00;"| 2
| style="color:black; background:#aaa;"| 3
| style="color:white; background:#fff;"| _
| style="color:white; background:#a00;"| 2
| style="color:black; background:#aaa;"| 3
| style="color:white; background:#fff;"| _
| style="color:white; background:#a00;"| 2
| style="color:black; background:#aaa;"| 3
| style="color:white; background:#fff;"| _
| style="color:white; background:#a00;"| 2
| style="color:black; background:#aaa;"| 3
| style="color:white; background:#fff;"| _
| style="color:white; background:#a00;"| 2
| style="color:black; background:#aaa;"| 3
| style="color:white; background:#fff;"| _
| style="color:white; background:#a00;"| 2
| style="color:black; background:#aaa;"| 3
| style="color:white; background:#fff;"| _
|}

(*) Useless due to the duplication of one of the colors.

Mode 5, high intensity: 
{| class="wikitable" style="border-style: none" border="1" cellpadding="5"
| style="color:white; background:#000;" | 0 — [user-defined]
|-
| style="color:black; background:#5ff;" | 1 — bright cyan
|-
| style="color:black; background:#f55;" | 2 — bright red
|-
| style="color:black; background:#fff;" | 3 — white
|}

The sixteen combinations with the background color are:
{| style="border-style: none" border="0" cellpadding="5"
|-
| style="color:white; background:#000;"| 0
| style="color:black; background:#5ff;"| 1
| style="color:white; background:#fff;"| _
| style="color:white; background:#00a;"| 0
| style="color:black; background:#5ff;"| 1
| style="color:white; background:#fff;"| _
| style="color:white; background:#0a0;"| 0
| style="color:black; background:#5ff;"| 1
| style="color:white; background:#fff;"| _
| style="color:white; background:#0aa;"| 0
| style="color:black; background:#5ff;"| 1
| style="color:white; background:#fff;"| _
| style="color:white; background:#a00;"| 0
| style="color:black; background:#5ff;"| 1
| style="color:white; background:#fff;"| _
| style="color:white; background:#a0a;"| 0
| style="color:black; background:#5ff;"| 1
| style="color:white; background:#fff;"| _
| style="color:white; background:#a50;"| 0
| style="color:black; background:#5ff;"| 1
| style="color:white; background:#fff;"| _
| style="color:black; background:#aaa;"| 0
| style="color:black; background:#5ff;"| 1
| style="color:white; background:#fff;"| _
|-
| style="color:black; background:#f55;"| 2
| style="color:black; background:#fff;"| 3
| style="color:white; background:#fff;"| _
| style="color:black; background:#f55;"| 2
| style="color:black; background:#fff;"| 3
| style="color:white; background:#fff;"| _
| style="color:black; background:#f55;"| 2
| style="color:black; background:#fff;"| 3
| style="color:white; background:#fff;"| _
| style="color:black; background:#f55;"| 2
| style="color:black; background:#fff;"| 3
| style="color:white; background:#fff;"| _
| style="color:black; background:#f55;"| 2
| style="color:black; background:#fff;"| 3
| style="color:white; background:#fff;"| _
| style="color:black; background:#f55;"| 2
| style="color:black; background:#fff;"| 3
| style="color:white; background:#fff;"| _
| style="color:black; background:#f55;"| 2
| style="color:black; background:#fff;"| 3
| style="color:white; background:#fff;"| _
| style="color:black; background:#f55;"| 2
| style="color:black; background:#fff;"| 3
| style="color:white; background:#fff;"| _
|}
{| style="border-style: none" border="0" cellpadding="5"
|-
| style="color:white; background:#555;"| 0
| style="color:black; background:#5ff;"| 1
| style="color:white; background:#fff;"| _
| style="color:white; background:#55f;"| 0
| style="color:black; background:#5ff;"| 1
| style="color:white; background:#fff;"| _
| style="color:black; background:#5f5;"| 0
| style="color:black; background:#5ff;"| 1
| style="color:white; background:#fff;"| _
| style="color:black; background:#5ff;"| 0
| style="color:black; background:#5ff;"| 1
| style="color:black; background:#fff;"| *
| style="color:black; background:#f55;"| 0
| style="color:black; background:#5ff;"| 1
| style="color:black; background:#fff;"| *
| style="color:black; background:#f5f;"| 0
| style="color:black; background:#5ff;"| 1
| style="color:white; background:#fff;"| _
| style="color:black; background:#ff5;"| 0
| style="color:black; background:#5ff;"| 1
| style="color:white; background:#fff;"| _
| style="color:black; background:#fff;"| 0
| style="color:black; background:#5ff;"| 1
| style="color:black; background:#fff;"| *
|-
| style="color:black; background:#f55;"| 2
| style="color:black; background:#fff;"| 3
| style="color:white; background:#fff;"| _
| style="color:black; background:#f55;"| 2
| style="color:black; background:#fff;"| 3
| style="color:white; background:#fff;"| _
| style="color:black; background:#f55;"| 2
| style="color:black; background:#fff;"| 3
| style="color:white; background:#fff;"| _
| style="color:black; background:#f55;"| 2
| style="color:black; background:#fff;"| 3
| style="color:white; background:#fff;"| _
| style="color:black; background:#f55;"| 2
| style="color:black; background:#fff;"| 3
| style="color:white; background:#fff;"| _
| style="color:black; background:#f55;"| 2
| style="color:black; background:#fff;"| 3
| style="color:white; background:#fff;"| _
| style="color:black; background:#f55;"| 2
| style="color:black; background:#fff;"| 3
| style="color:white; background:#fff;"| _
| style="color:black; background:#f55;"| 2
| style="color:black; background:#fff;"| 3
| style="color:white; background:#fff;"| _
|}

(*) Useless due to the duplication of one of the colors.

When viewed in a monochrome composite monitor, the mode 5 palettes above are shown as a (more or less brighter) 2-bit grayscale palette:

2-color palette mode 
In the 640×200 graphic mode (BIOS mode number 6), every pixel has only a single bit. The foreground color can be set, with the default being white.

{|
| 2-color
| 2-color comparison image
|-
|
|
|}

{|class="wikitable" style="border-style: none" border="1" cellpadding="5"
| style="color:white; background:#000;"| 0 — black
|-
| style="color:black; background:#fff;"| 1 — [user-defined]
|}
The sixteen combinations are:
{| style="border-style: none" border="0" cellpadding="5"
|-
| style="color:white; background:#000;"| 0
| style="color:white; background:#000;"| 1
| style="color:white; background:#fff;"| _
| style="color:white; background:#000;"| 0
| style="color:white; background:#00a;"| 1
| style="color:white; background:#fff;"| _
| style="color:white; background:#000;"| 0
| style="color:white; background:#0a0;"| 1
| style="color:white; background:#fff;"| _
| style="color:white; background:#000;"| 0
| style="color:white; background:#0aa;"| 1
| style="color:white; background:#fff;"| _
| style="color:white; background:#000;"| 0
| style="color:white; background:#a00;"| 1
| style="color:white; background:#fff;"| _
| style="color:white; background:#000;"| 0
| style="color:white; background:#a0a;"| 1
| style="color:white; background:#fff;"| _
| style="color:white; background:#000;"| 0
| style="color:white; background:#a50;"| 1
| style="color:white; background:#fff;"| _
| style="color:white; background:#000;"| 0
| style="color:black; background:#aaa;"| 1
| style="color:white; background:#fff;"| _
|}
{| style="border-style: none" border="0" cellpadding="5"
|-
| style="color:white; background:#000;"| 0
| style="color:white; background:#555;"| 1
| style="color:white; background:#fff;"| _
| style="color:white; background:#000;"| 0
| style="color:white; background:#55f;"| 1
| style="color:white; background:#fff;"| _
| style="color:white; background:#000;"| 0
| style="color:black; background:#5f5;"| 1
| style="color:white; background:#fff;"| _
| style="color:white; background:#000;"| 0
| style="color:black; background:#5ff;"| 1
| style="color:white; background:#fff;"| _
| style="color:white; background:#000;"| 0
| style="color:white; background:#f55;"| 1
| style="color:white; background:#fff;"| _
| style="color:white; background:#000;"| 0
| style="color:white; background:#f5f;"| 1
| style="color:white; background:#fff;"| _
| style="color:white; background:#000;"| 0
| style="color:black; background:#ff5;"| 1
| style="color:white; background:#fff;"| _
| style="color:white; background:#000;"| 0
| style="color:black; background:#fff;"| 1
| style="color:white; background:#fff;"| _
|}

PCjr and Tandy 1000 series
The IBM PCjr features a "CGA Plus" video subsystem, consisting mainly of a 6845 CRTC and an LSI video chip known as the "Video Gate Array", that can show all 16 CGA colors simultaneously on screen in the extended low-res graphic modes. The near-compatible Tandy 1000 series features almost 100% PCjr-compatible video hardware implemented in a Tandy proprietary chip. This graphics adapter is better known by the name Tandy Graphics Adapter, because the PCjr was short-lived but the Tandy 1000 line was quite popular for many years.  The video mode capabilities of early-model Tandy 1000 computers are exactly the same as the PCjr's.  (Later Tandy 1000 models featured "Tandy Video II" hardware which added a 640x200 16-color mode but surrendered PCjr hardware register-compatibility for CGA register-compatibility.)

The PCjr adds three video modes to the CGA mode set: 160×200 16-color "low-resolution" graphics, 320×200 16-color "medium-resolution" graphics, and 640×200 4-color "high-resolution" graphics.  All PCjr/Tandy 1000 graphics modes can reassign any color index to any palette entry, allowing free selection of all palette
colors in modes with fewer than 16 colors (including the plain CGA modes) and enabling color cycling effects in all modes.  The PCjr also offers a graphics blink function which causes 8 colors to alternate between the low and high halves of the 16-color palette at the text blink rate.  (A PCjr must be upgraded with a PCjr-specific internal 64 KB memory expansion card in order to use the latter two of these modes or any 80-column text mode.  Tandy 1000 base models can use all video modes.)

Thomson
For Thomson computers, a popular brand in France, the most common display modes are 320×200, with 8×1 attribute cells with 2 colors. Here the intensity byte affects saturation and not only brightness variations.

Thomson MO5
The Thomson MO5 generated graphics based on a EFGJ03L (or MA4Q-1200) gate array capable of 40×25 text display and a resolution of 320 x 200 pixels with 16 colours (subject to proximity constraints - only two colors for a 8x1 pixel area).

The colour palette has 8 basic RGB colours with an intensity bit (called P for "Pastel") that controlled saturation ("saturated" or "pastel"). In memory, the bit order was PBGR. The desaturated colours were obtained by mixing of the original RGB components within the video hardware. This is done by a PROM circuit, where a two bit mask controls colour mixing ratios of 0%, 33%, 66% and 100% of the saturated hue. This approach allows the display of Orange instead of "desaturated white", and Gray instead of "desaturated black".

According to the values specified on the computer's technical manual (“Manuel Technique du MO5”, pg. 11 & 19), the hardware palette was:

Displayed colors are only approximate due to different transfer and color spaces used on web pages (sRGB) and analog video (BT.601)

Actual colour on emulators and later models seems to have been tweaked, with normal Blue and Red being fully saturated.

{|
| Simulated image
| Color test chart
|-
| 
| 
|}

Thomson TO7/70
The Thomson TO7/70 graphics were similar to the Thomson MO5 and generated by a Motorola MCA1300 gate array.  capable of 40×25 text display and a resolution of 320 x 200 pixels with 16 colours (limited by 8x1 pixel colour attribute areas). The colour palette is 4-bit RGBI, with 8 basic RGB colours and a intensity bit (called P for "Pastel") that controlled saturation ("saturated" or "pastel").

Fixed color palette 1 (similar to MO5)
{|
| Sample image
| Color test chart
|-
| 
| 
|}

{| class="wikitable"
|-
| style="color: white; background: #000; text-align: center; width: 4pc;" | 0x0 K
| style="color: white; background: #00f; text-align: center; width: 4pc;" | 0x1 B
| style="color: white; background: #f00; text-align: center; width: 4pc;" | 0x2 R
| style="color: white; background: #f0f; text-align: center; width: 4pc;" | 0x3 M
| style="color: white; background: #0f0; text-align: center; width: 4pc;" | 0x4 G
| style="color: black; background: #0ff; text-align: center; width: 4pc;" | 0x5 C
| style="color: black; background: #ff0; text-align: center; width: 4pc;" | 0x6 Y
| style="color: black; background: #fff; text-align: center; width: 4pc;" | 0x7 W
|-
| style="color: white; background: #d77; text-align: center; width: 4pc;" | 0x8
| style="color: black; background: #eb0; text-align: center; width: 4pc;" | 0x9
| style="color: black; background: #dd7; text-align: center; width: 4pc;" | 0xA
| style="color: black; background: #7d7; text-align: center; width: 4pc;" | 0xB
| style="color: black; background: #bff; text-align: center; width: 4pc;" | 0xC
| style="color: white; background: #77d; text-align: center; width: 4pc;" | 0xD
| style="color: black; background: #d7e; text-align: center; width: 4pc;" | 0xE
| style="color: black; background: #bbb; text-align: center; width: 4pc;" | 0xF
|}

Fixed color palette 2
{|
| 
| 
|}
{| class="wikitable"
|-
| style="color: white; background: #000; text-align: center; width: 4pc;" | 0x0
| style="color: white; background: #00f; text-align: center; width: 4pc;" | 0x1
| style="color: white; background: #f00; text-align: center; width: 4pc;" | 0x2
| style="color: white; background: #f0f; text-align: center; width: 4pc;" | 0x3
| style="color: white; background: #0f0; text-align: center; width: 4pc;" | 0x4
| style="color: black; background: #0ff; text-align: center; width: 4pc;" | 0x5
| style="color: black; background: #ff0; text-align: center; width: 4pc;" | 0x6
| style="color: black; background: #fff; text-align: center; width: 4pc;" | 0x7
|-
| style="color: white; background: #555; text-align: center; width: 4pc;" | 0x8
| style="color: black; background: #aaa; text-align: center; width: 4pc;" | 0x9
| style="color: white; background: #c00; text-align: center; width: 4pc;" | 0xA
| style="color: white; background: #0a0; text-align: center; width: 4pc;" | 0xB
| style="color: white; background: #00e; text-align: center; width: 4pc;" | 0xC
| style="color: white; background: #099; text-align: center; width: 4pc;" | 0xD
| style="color: white; background: #b0b; text-align: center; width: 4pc;" | 0xE
| style="color: white; background: #770; text-align: center; width: 4pc;" | 0xF
|}

Fixed color palette 3
{|
| 
| 
|}
{| class="wikitable"
|+ Example of 16 fixed color palette 3
|-
| style="color: white; background: #000; text-align: center; width: 4pc;" | 0x0
| style="color: white; background: #00f; text-align: center; width: 4pc;" | 0x1
| style="color: white; background: #f00; text-align: center; width: 4pc;" | 0x2
| style="color: white; background: #f0f; text-align: center; width: 4pc;" | 0x3
| style="color: white; background: #0f0; text-align: center; width: 4pc;" | 0x4
| style="color: black; background: #0ff; text-align: center; width: 4pc;" | 0x5
| style="color: black; background: #ff0; text-align: center; width: 4pc;" | 0x6
| style="color: black; background: #fff; text-align: center; width: 4pc;" | 0x7
|-
| style="color: white; background: #555; text-align: center; width: 4pc;" | 0x8
| style="color: white; background: #00a; text-align: center; width: 4pc;" | 0x9
| style="color: white; background: #a00; text-align: center; width: 4pc;" | 0xA
| style="color: black; background: #f5f; text-align: center; width: 4pc;" | 0xB
| style="color: white; background: #0a0; text-align: center; width: 4pc;" | 0xC
| style="color: black; background: #5ff; text-align: center; width: 4pc;" | 0xD
| style="color: black; background: #ff5; text-align: center; width: 4pc;" | 0xE
| style="color: black; background: #aaa; text-align: center; width: 4pc;" | 0xF
|}

Mattel Aquarius
The Mattel Aquarius computer has a text mode with 40×24 characters, that can be used as a semigraphic 80×72 low resolution graphics mode. There are spatial constraints ("attribute" areas) for different colors, consisting of 2x3 pixel groups. 

The machine uses a TEA1002 graphic chip, and there are three bits for the RGB components (generating 8 primary colors at full saturation but 75% luminance - similar to the EBU colour bars) and an intensity bit that controls a variation of the base color (a 75% luminance decrease for white, creating gray; a 50% chroma saturation decrease for the RGB primary colors).

{|
|-
|| 
|| 
|}

3 level RGB palettes

Amstrad CPC series

The Amstrad CPC 464/664/6128 series of computers generates the available palette with 3 levels (not bits) for every RGB primary. Thus, there are 27 different RGB combinations, from which 16 can be simultaneously displayed in low resolution mode, four in medium resolution mode and two in high resolution mode.

{|
| 
| 
| 
|}

Simulations of actual images on the Amstrad's color monitor in each of the modes (160×200x16 colors; 320×200x4 colors and 640×200x2 colors) follows. A cheaper green monochrome display was also available from the manufacturer; in this case, the colors are viewed as a 16-tone green scale, as shown in the last simulated image, as it interprets the overall brightness of the full color signal, instead of only considering the green intensity as might, e.g., the Philips CM8833 line.

{|
| 2 colors
| 4 colors
| 16 colors
| 16-tone green scale
|-
| 
| 
| 
| 
|}

{|class="wikitable" style="border-style: none; width: 100%; height: 100%" border="1" cellpadding="5"
|- style="color:white"
| style="background:black"| 0 – Black (5)
| style="background:navy"| 1 – Dark blue (0,14)
| style="background:blue"| 2 – Blue (6)
| style="background:maroon"| 3 – Dark red
| style="background:purple"| 4 – Dark magenta
| style="background:#8000ff"| 5 – Violet
| style="background:red"| 6 – Red (3)
| style="background:#ff0080"| 7 – Magenta-red
| style="background:magenta"| 8 – Magenta (7)
|- style="color:white"
| style="background:green"| 9 – Dark green
| style="background:teal"| 10 – Dark cyan (8)
| style="background:#0080ff"| 11 – Cyan-blue (15)
| style="background:olive"| 12 – Dark yellow (brown) (9)
| style="background:grey"| 13 – Grey
| style="background:#8080ff"| 14 – Light blue (10)
| style="color:black;background:#ff8000"| 15 – Orange
| style="color:black;background:#ff8080"| 16 – Pink (11, 15)
| style="color:black;background:#ff80ff"| 17 – Light magenta
|- style="color:black"
| style="background:lime"| 18 – Green (12)
| style="background:#00ff80"| 19 – Cyan-green
| style="background:cyan"| 20 – Cyan (2)
| style="background:#80ff00"| 21 – Yellow-green
| style="background:#80ff80"| 22 – Light green (13)
| style="background:#80ffff"| 23 – Light cyan
| style="background:yellow"| 24 – Yellow (1, 14)
| style="background:#ffff80"| 25 – Light yellow
| style="background:white"| 26 – White (4)
|}

The number in parentheses means the primary ink number for the Locomotive BASIC PEN, PAPER and INK statements (that is, "(1)" means ink #1 defaults to this color). Inks can also have a secondary color number, meaning they flash between two colors. By default, ink #14 alternates between colors 1 and 24 (blue and bright yellow) and ink #15 alternates between colors 11 and 16 (cyan-blue and pink). In addition, the paper defaults to ink #0 and the pen to ink #1, meaning yellow text on a dark blue background.

8-bit RGB palettes

{| style="border-style: none" border="0" cellpadding="0"
|-
|| 
|| 
|}

The 8-bit RGB palettes (also known as 3-3-2 bit RGB) use 3 bits for each of the red and green color components, and 2 bits for the blue component, due to the lesser sensitivity of the common human eye to this primary color. This results in an 8×8×4 = 256-color palette as follows:

{| class="wikitable" style="text-align: center;"
|-
! style="width: 4pc" | Red
| style="color: white; background-color: #000000; width: 5pc;" | #000000
| style="color: white; background-color: #240000; width: 5pc;" | #240000
| style="color: white; background-color: #490000; width: 5pc;" | #490000
| style="color: white; background-color: #6d0000; width: 5pc;" | #6D0000
| style="color: white; background-color: #920000; width: 5pc;" | #920000
| style="color: white; background-color: #b60000; width: 5pc;" | #B60000
| style="color: white; background-color: #db0000; width: 5pc;" | #DB0000
| style="color: white; background-color: #ff0000; width: 5pc;" | #FF0000
|-
! style="width: 4pc" | Green
| style="color: white; background-color: #000000; width: 5pc;" | #000000
| style="color: white; background-color: #002400; width: 5pc;" | #002400
| style="color: white; background-color: #004900; width: 5pc;" | #004900
| style="color: white; background-color: #006d00; width: 5pc;" | #006D00
| style="color: white; background-color: #009200; width: 5pc;" | #009200
| style="color: white; background-color: #00b600; width: 5pc;" | #00B600
| style="color: white; background-color: #00db00; width: 5pc;" | #00DB00
| style="color: white; background-color: #00ff00; width: 5pc;" | #00FF00
|-
! style="width: 4pc" | Blue
| style="color: white; background-color: #000000; width: 5pc;" colspan="2" | #000000
| style="color: white; background-color: #000055; width: 5pc;" colspan="2" | #000055
| style="color: white; background-color: #0000aa; width: 5pc;" colspan="2" | #0000AA
| style="color: white; background-color: #0000ff; width: 5pc;" colspan="2" | #0000FF
|}

Tiki 100
The Tiki 100 uses a 8-bit RGB palette (also described as 3-3-2 bit RGB), with 3 bits for each of the red and green color components, and 2 bits for the blue component.
It supports 3 different resolutions with 256, 512 or 1024 by 256 pixels and 16, 4, or 2 colors respectively (freely selectable from the full 256 color palette).

Enterprise
The Enterprise computer has five graphics modes: 40- and 80-column text modes, Lo-Res and Hi-Res bit mapped graphics, and attribute graphics. Bit mapped graphics modes allow selection between displays of 2, 4,16 or 256 colors (from a 3-3-2 bit RGB palette), but horizontal resolution decreases as color depth increases.

Interlaced and non-interlaced modes are available. The maximum resolution is 640×512 pixels interlaced, or 640×256 pixels non-interlaced. These resolutions permit only a 2-colour display.

A 256-colour display has a maximum resolution of 80×256. The attribute graphics mode provides a 320×256 pixel resolution with 16 colors, selectable from a palette of 256.

Multiple pages can be displayed simultaneously on the screen, even if their graphics modes are different. Each page has its own palette, which allows more colors to be displayed onscreen simultaneously. The page height can be larger than the screen or the window it is displayed on. Each page is connected to a channel of the EXOS operating system, so it is possible to write on a hidden page.

MSX2
On the MSX2 screen mode 8 is a high-resolution 256×212-pixel mode with an 8-bit color depth, giving a palette of 256 colors (Fixed RGB mode of the Yamaha V9938 video chip). From the MSB to LSB, there are three green bits, three red bits, and two blue bits. This mode uses half of the available colors overall, and can be considered a palette in its own right.

9-bit RGB palettes
The MSX2 series features a Yamaha V9938 video chip, which manages a 9-bit RGB palette (512 colors in Paletted RGB mode) and has some extended graphic modes. Although its graphical capabilities are similar, or even better than of those of 16-bit personal computers, MSX2 and MSX2+ (see below) are pure 8-bit machines.

{|
| 
| 
|}

Screen mode 6 is a 512×212-pixel mode with a 4-color palette chosen from the available 512 colors.
Screen modes 5 and 7 are high-resolution 256×212-pixel and 512×212-pixel modes, respectively, with a 16-color palette chosen from the available 512 colors. Each pixel can be any of the 16 selected colors.

{|
| 4-color screen mode 6
| 16-color screen mode 5
|-
| 
| 
|}

15-bit RGB palettes

MSX2+
The MSX2+ series (released in 1988) features a Yamaha V9958 video chip which manages a 15-bit RGB palette internally encoded in YJK (up to 19,268 different colors from the 32,768 theoretically possible) and has additional screen modes. Although its graphical capabilities are similar, or even better than of those of 16-bit personal computers, MSX2 (see above) and MSX2+ are pure 8-bit machines. YJK color encoding can be viewed as a lossy compression technique; in the RGB to YJK conversion, the average red and green levels are preserved, but blue is subsampled. As a result of every four pixels sharing a chroma value, in mode 12 it is not possible to have vertical lines of a single color. This is only possible in modes 10 and 11 due to the additional 16-color direct palette. This can be used to mix 16 indexed colors with a rich colorful background, in what can be considered a primitive video overlay technique.

{|
| 
| 
| style="vertical-align:top;" | 
|}

Screen modes 10 & 11 – 12,499 YJK colors plus a 16-color palette. In this mode, the YJK technique encodes 16 levels of luminance into the four LSBs of each pixel and 64 levels of chroma, from −32 to +31, shared across every four consecutive pixels and stored in the three higher bits of the four pixels. If the fifth bit of the pixel is set, then the lower four bits of the pixel points to an index in the 16-color palette; otherwise, they specify the YJK luminance level of the pixel.

Screen mode 12 is similar to modes 10 and 11, but uses five bits to encode 32 levels of luminance for every pixel, thus it does not use an additional palette and, with YJK encoding, 19,268 different colors can be displayed simultaneously with 8-bit color depth.

{|
| Screen mode 10 & 11
| Screen mode 12
|-
| 
| 
|}

18-bit RGB palettes

Fujitsu

Fujitsu's FM-77 AV 40, released in 1986, uses an 18-bit RGB palette. Any 64,000 out of 262,144 colors can be displayed simultaneously at the 320×200 resolution, or 8 out of 262,144 colors at the 640×400 resolution.

{| style="border-style: none" border="0" cellpadding="0"
|-
|| 
|| 
|}

Composite video palettes
This section covers systems that generate color directly as composite video, closely related with display on analog CRT TVs. Many of the colors are non-standard and outside of RGB gamut, and would only display properly on NTSC hardware.
Due to the varying ways of converting a composite signal to sRGB (the standard for internet images), images in this section will be inconsistent with each other in color until further notice.

Atari 400/800/XL/XE
The early Atari 400 and 800 computers use a palette of 128 colors (a bit similar to the one used on the Atari 2600 console, and the Commodore 16 and Plus/4), using 4 bits for chrominance, and 3 for luminance. Screen modes may vary from 320×192 (384x240 with overscan) to 40×24, using 2 or 4 simultaneous colors, or 80×192 (96x240 with overscan) using 16 colors. After 2 years (late 1981) the CTIA graphics chip was replaced with the GTIA chip thus increasing the palette to 256 colors (CTIA and GTIA).

The ANTIC chip in the Atari 8-bit family computers (400, 800, XL and XE models) has an instruction set to run programs (called display list) which permits many more colors on the screen at once. There are a number of possible software-driven graphics modes.

CTIA palette
{|
| 
| 
|}

GTIA palette

Apple II series

The Apple II series features a 16-color composite video palette, based on the YIQ color space used by the NTSC color TV system.

Low-res mode palette 

The 40x48 pixel lo-res mode allowed 15 different colors plus a duplicate gray. 
{|
| 
| 
| 
|style="vertical-align: top;" | 
|}

{|class="wikitable"
!| Number — name || Y || I || Q || Number — name || Y || I || Q
|-
| style="color:white; background:#000;"| 0 — black || 0 || 0 || 0
| style="color:white; background:#404c00;"| 8 — brown*** || 0.25 || 0.5 || -0.5
|-
| style="color:white; background:#722640;"| 1 — red || 0.25 || 0.5 || 0.5
| style="color:white; background:#e46501;"| 9 — orange || 0.5 || 1 || 0
|-
| style="color:white; background:#40337f;"| 2 — dark blue || 0.25 || -0.5 || 0.5
| style="color:white; background:gray;"| 10 — gray || 0.5 || 0 || 0
|-
| style="color:white; background:#e434fe;"| 3 — purple || 0.5 || 0 || 1
| style="color:black; background:#f1a6bf;"| 11 — pink || 0.75 || 0.5 || 0.5
|-
| style="color:white; background:#0e5940;"| 4 — dark green || 0.25 || -0.5 || -0.5
| style="color:white; background:#1bcb01;"| 12 — bright green || 0.5 || 0 || -1
|-
| style="color:white; background:gray;"| 5 — gray || 0.5 || 0 || 0
| style="color:black; background:#bfcc80;"| 13 — yellow || 0.75 || 0.5 || -0.5
|-
| style="color:white; background:#1b9afe;"| 6 — blue-cyan || 0.5 || -1 || 0
| style="color:black; background:#8dd9bf;"| 14 — cyan || 0.75 || -0.5 || 0.5
|-
| style="color:black; background:#bfb3ff;"| 7 — light blue*** || 0.75 || -0.5 || 0.5
| style="color:black; background:#fff;"| 15 — white || 1 || 0 || 0
|}
 Notes: Italic text and three asterisks (***) denotes colors outside of RGB gamut.

High-res mode palette 

The majority of Apple graphic applications used the hi-res mode, which had 280×192 pixels (effectively 140x192 on a color monitor). The hi-res mode allowed six colors: black, white, blue, orange, green and purple. 

{|class="wikitable"
!| High bit || Pixel pair || Number — Name || Y || I || Q
|-
| 0 || 00 || style="color:white; background:#000000;"| 0 — black || 0 || 0 || 0
|-
| 0 || 01 || style="color:white; background:#ff00ff;"| 1 — purple || 0.5 || 1 || 1
|-
| 0 || 10 || style="color:white; background:#00ff00;"| 2 — green || 0.5 || −1 || −1
|-
| 0 || 11 || style="color:black; background:#ffffff;"| 3 — white || 1 || 0 || 0
|-
| 1 || 00 || style="color:white; background:#000000;"| 4 — black || 0 || 0 || 0
|-
| 1 || 01 || style="color:white; background:#00afff;"| 5 — blue || 0.5 || 1 || −1
|-
| 1 || 10 || style="color:white; background:#ff5000;"| 6 — orange || 0.5 || −1 || 1
|-
| 1 || 11 || style="color:black; background:#ffffff;"| 7 — white || 1 || 0 || 0
|}

Systems based on MOS Technology chips
For all the following computers from Commodore, the U and V coordinates for the composite video colors are always the cosine and the sine, respectively, of angles multiple of 22.5 degrees (i.e. a quarter of 90°), as the engineers were inspired by the NTSC color wheel, a radial way to figure out the U and V coordinates of points equidistant from the center of the chroma plane, the gray. Consumers in Europe (which uses PAL) considered the Commodore colors to be more "washed out" and less vivid than those provided by computers such as the ZX Spectrum.

VIC-20

The VIC-20 uses a MOS Technology VIC chip which produces a 16-color YPbPr composite video palette. The palette lacks any intermediate shade of gray, and it has 5 or 9 levels of luminance.

The VIC-20 lacks any true graphic mode, but a 22×11 text mode with 200 definable characters of 8×16 bits each arranged as a matrix of 20×10 characters is usually used instead, giving a 3:2(NTSC)/5:3(PAL) pixel aspect ratio, 160×160 pixels, 8-color "high-res mode" or a 3:1(NTSC)/10:3(PAL) pixel aspect ratio, 80×160 pixels, 10-color "multicolor mode".

{|
| VIC-20 palette
|
|
|-
| 
| 
|style="vertical-align: top;" |
|}

In the 8-color high-res mode, every 8×8 pixels can have the background color (shared for the entire screen) or a free foreground color, both selectable among the first eight colors of the palette. In the 10-color multicolor mode, a single pixel of every 4×8 block (a character cell) may have any of four colors: the background color, the auxiliary color (both shared for the entire screen and selectable among the entire palette), the same color as the overscan border (also a shared color) or a free foreground color, both selectable among the first eight colors of the palette.

Simulated images
{|
| Multicolor mode
| High-res mode
|-
| 
| 
|}

On some models of the system, there are nine levels of luminance:

{| class="wikitable" style="border-style: none;" border="1" cellpadding="5"
!| Number — name || Y || Pb (rel.) || Pr (rel.) || Number — name || Y || Pb (rel.) || Pr (rel.)
|- 
| style="color:white; background:#000000;" | 0 — black || 0 || 0 || 0 
| style="color:white; background:#8b5429;" | 8 — orange || 0.375 || −0.7071068 || 0.7071068 
|- 
| style="color:black; background:#ffffff;" | 1 — white || 1 || 0 || 0 
| style="color:white; background:#d59f74;" | 9 — light orange || 0.625 || −0.7071068 || 0.7071068 
|- 
| style="color:white; background:#8d3e37;" | 2 — red || 0.3125 || −0.3826834 || 0.9238795 
| style="color:white; background:#b86962;" | 10 — light red || 0.5 || −0.3826834 || 0.9238795 
|- 
| style="color:white; background:#72c1c8;" | 3 — cyan || 0.6875 || 0.3826834 || −0.9238795 
| style="color:black; background:#87d6dd;" | 11 — light cyan || 0.75 || 0.3826834 || −0.9238795 
|- 
| style="color:white; background:#80348b;" | 4 — purple || 0.3125 || 0.7071068 || 0.7071068 
| style="color:white; background:#aa5fb6;" | 12 — light purple || 0.5 || 0.7071068 || 0.7071068 
|- 
| style="color:white; background:#55a049;" | 5 — green || 0.5 || −0.7071068 || −0.7071068 
| style="color:black; background:#94e089;" | 13 — light green || 0.75 || −0.7071068 || −0.7071068 
|- 
| style="color:white; background:#40318d;" | 6 — blue || 0.25 || 1 || 0 
| style="color:white; background:#8071cc;" | 14 — light blue || 0.5 || 1 || 0 
|- 
| style="color:black; background:#aab95d;" | 7 — yellow || 0.6875 || −1 || 0 
| style="color:black; background:#ffffb2;" | 15 — light yellow || 1 || −1 || 0 
|}

But on other models, there are only five levels of luminance:

{| class="wikitable" style="border-style: none;" border="1" cellpadding="5" 
!| Number — name || Y || Pb (rel.) || Pr (rel.) || Number — name || Y || Pb (rel.) || Pr (rel.)
|- 
| style="color:white; background:#000000;" | 0 — black || 0 || 0 || 0 
| style="color:white; background:#aa7449;" | 8 — orange || 0.5 || −0.7071068 || 0.7071068 
|- 
| style="color:black; background:#ffffff;" | 1 — white || 1 || 0 || 0 
| style="color:black; background:#eab489;" | 9 — light orange || 0.75 || −0.7071068 || 0.7071068 
|- 
| style="color:white; background:#782922;" | 2 — red || 0.25 || −0.3826834 || 0.9238795 
| style="color:white; background:#b86962;" | 10 — light red || 0.5 || −0.3826834 || 0.9238795 
|- 
| style="color:black; background:#87d6dd;" | 3 — cyan || 0.75 || 0.3826834 || −0.9238795 
| style="color:black; background:#c7ffff;" | 11 — light cyan || 1 || 0.3826834 || −0.9238795 
|- 
| style="color:white; background:#aa5fb6;" | 4 — purple || 0.5 || 0.7071068 || 0.7071068 
| style="color:black; background:#ea9ff6;" | 12 — light purple || 0.75 || 0.7071068 || 0.7071068 
|- 
| style="color:white; background:#55a049;" | 5 — green || 0.5 || −0.7071068 || −0.7071068 
| style="color:black; background:#94e089;" | 13 — light green || 0.75 || −0.7071068 || −0.7071068 
|- 
| style="color:white; background:#40318d;" | 6 — blue || 0.25 || 1 || 0 
| style="color:white; background:#8071cc;" | 14 — light blue || 0.5 || 1 || 0 
|- 
| style="color:black; background:#bfce72;" | 7 — yellow || 0.75 || −1 || 0 
| style="color:black; background:#ffffb2;" | 15 — light yellow || 1 || −1 || 0 
|}

Commodore 64
The MOS Technology VIC-II is used in the Commodore 64 (and Commodore 128 in 40-column mode), and features a 16-color YPbPr composite video palette. This palette is largely based on that of the VIC, but it substitutes three colors by three levels of gray. When displayed over an analog NTSC composite video output, the actual resulting colors are more vivid.

{|
| Sample image
| Color test chart
| Color palette
| C64 palette on NTSC (Sony CXA2025 decoder matrix)
|-
| style="vertical-align: top;" |
| style="vertical-align: top;" |
| style="vertical-align: top;" |
| 
|}

The Commodore 64 has two graphic modes: Multicolor and High Resolution.

In the Multicolor 160×200, 16-color mode, every cell of 4×8, 2:1 aspect ratio pixels can have one of four colors: one shared with the entire screen, the two background and foreground colors of the corresponding text mode character, and one more color also stored in the color RAM area, all of them freely selectable among the entire palette.

In the High Resolution 320×200, 16-color mode, every cell of 8×8 pixels can have one of the two background and foreground colors of the correspondent text mode character, both freely selectable among the entire palette.

Simulated images
{|
| 16-color multicolor mode
| 16-color High-res mode
|-
| 
| 
|}

On most models of the Commodore 64, there are nine levels of luminance:

{|class="wikitable" style="border-style: none;" border="1" cellpadding="5" 
!| Number — name || Y || Pb (rel.) || Pr (rel.)|| Number — name || Y || Pb (rel.) || Pr (rel.)
|- 
| style="color:white; background:#000000;"| 0 — black || 0 || 0 || 0 
| style="color:white; background:#8b5429;"| 8 — orange || 0.375 || −0.7071068 || 0.7071068 
|- 
| style="color:black; background:#ffffff;"| 1 — white || 1 || 0 || 0 
| style="color:white; background:#574200;"| 9 — brown || 0.25 || −0.9238795 || 0.3826834 
|- 
| style="color:white; background:#883932;"| 2 — red || 0.3125 || −0.3826834 || 0.9238795 
| style="color:white; background:#b86962;"| 10 — light red || 0.5 || −0.3826834 || 0.9238795 
|- 
| style="color:white; background:#67b6bd;"| 3 — cyan || 0.625 || 0.3826834 || −0.9238795 
| style="color:white; background:#505050;"| 11 — dark grey || 0.3125 || 0 || 0 
|- 
| style="color:white; background:#8b3f96;"| 4 — purple || 0.375 || 0.7071068 || 0.7071068 
| style="color:white; background:#787878;"| 12 — grey || 0.46875 || 0 || 0 
|- 
| style="color:white; background:#55a049;"| 5 — green || 0.5 || −0.7071068 || −0.7071068 
| style="color:black; background:#94e089;"| 13 — light green || 0.75 || −0.7071068 || −0.7071068 
|- 
| style="color:white; background:#40318d;"| 6 — blue || 0.25 || 1 || 0 
| style="color:white; background:#7869c4;"| 14 — light blue || 0.46875 || 1 || 0 
|- 
| style="color:black; background:#bfce72;"| 7 — yellow || 0.75 || −1 || 0 
| style="color:black; background:#9f9f9f;"| 15 — light grey || 0.625 || 0 || 0 
|}

Commodore 16 and Plus/4

The MOS Technology TED was used in the Commodore 16 and Commodore Plus/4. It has a palette of 121 YPbPr composite video colors consisting of sixteen hues (including black and white) at eight luminance levels. Black is the same color at every luminance level, so there are not 128 different colors. On the Commodore Plus/4, twelve colors formed a "default" palette of sorts accessible through keyboard shortcuts; these colors are underlined in the table below (RGB converted colors at a saturation level of 34%).

{|
| 
| 
|style="vertical-align:top;" | 
|}

The Commodore 16 and Commodore Plus/4 have two graphic modes very similar to those of the Commodore 64: Multicolor and High Resolution.

In the Multicolor 160×200, 121-color mode, every cell of 4×8, 2:1 aspect ratio pixels can have one of four colors: two shared with the entire screen and the two background and foreground colors of the correspondent text mode character, all of them freely selectable among the entire 121-color palette (hue 0 to 15 and luminance 0 to 7 are set individually for any of them).

In the High Resolution 320×200, 121-color mode, every cell of 8×8 pixels can have one of the two background and foreground colors of the corresponding text mode character, both freely selectable among the entire 121-color palette (again setting both the hue and the luminance).

Simulated images
{|
| 121-color Multicolor mode
| 121-color High-res mode
|-
| 
| 
|}

{|class="wikitable"
|style="width:8.75pc;" |
|style="width:3pc;" |
|style="width:3pc;" | luma #
|style="width:3pc;" | 0
|style="width:3pc;" | 1
|style="width:3pc;" | 2
|style="width:3pc;" | 3
|style="width:3pc;" | 4
|style="width:3pc;" | 5
|style="width:3pc;" | 6
|style="width:3pc;" | 7
|-
| || || Y
|| 0.125 || 0.25 || 0.375 || 0.5 || 0.625 || 0.75 || 0.875 || 1
|-
|| hue #
|| Pb (rel.)
|| Pr (rel.)
|| . || . || . || . || . || . || . || .
|-
| 0 — black || 0 || 0
| style="color:white; background:#000;"| 0,0
| style="color:white; background:#000;"| 0,1
| style="color:white; background:#000;"| 0,2
| style="color:white; background:#000;"| 0,3
| style="color:white; background:#000;"| 0,4
| style="color:white; background:#000;"| 0,5
| style="color:white; background:#000;"| 0,6
| style="color:white; background:#000;"| 0,7
|-
| 1 — white || 0 || 0
| style="color:white; background:#202020;"| 1,0
| style="color:white; background:#404040;"| 1,1
| style="color:white; background:#606060;"| 1,2
| style="color:white; background:gray;"| 1,3
| style="color:white; background:#9f9f9f;"| 1,4
| style="color:black; background:#bfbfbf;"| 1,5
| style="color:black; background:#dfdfdf;"| 1,6
| style="color:black; background:#fff;"| 1,7
|-
| 2 — red || −0.3826834 || 0.9238795
| style="color:white; background:#580902;"| 2,0
| style="color:white; background:#782922;"| 2,1
| style="color:white; background:#984942;"| 2,2
| style="color:white; background:#b86962;"| 2,3
| style="color:white; background:#d88882;"| 2,4
| style="color:black; background:#f7a8a2;"| 2,5
| style="color:black; background:#ffc8c2;"| 2,6*
| style="color:black; background:#ffe8e2;"| 2,7*
|-
| 3 — cyan || 0.3826834 || −0.9238795
| style="color:white; background:#00373d;"| 3,0*
| style="color:white; background:#08575d;"| 3,1
| style="color:white; background:#27777d;"| 3,2
| style="color:white; background:#47969d;"| 3,3
| style="color:white; background:#67b6bd;"| 3,4
| style="color:black; background:#87d6dd;"| 3,5
| style="color:black; background:#a7f6fd;"| 3,6
| style="color:black; background:#c7ffff;"| 3,7*
|-
| 4 — purple || 0.7071068 || 0.7071068
| style="color:white; background:#4b0056;"| 4,0*
| style="color:white; background:#6b1f76;"| 4,1
| style="color:white; background:#8b3f96;"| 4,2
| style="color:white; background:#aa5fb6;"| 4,3
| style="color:white; background:#ca7fd6;"| 4,4
| style="color:black; background:#ea9ff6;"| 4,5
| style="color:black; background:#ffbfff;"| 4,6*
| style="color:black; background:#ffdfff;"| 4,7*
|-
| 5 — green || −0.7071068 || −0.7071068
| style="color:white; background:#004000;"| 5,0*
| style="color:white; background:#156009;"| 5,1
| style="color:white; background:#358029;"| 5,2
| style="color:white; background:#55a049;"| 5,3
| style="color:white; background:#74c069;"| 5,4
| style="color:black; background:#94e089;"| 5,5
| style="color:black; background:#b4ffa9;"| 5,6*
| style="color:black; background:#d4ffc9;"| 5,7*
|-
| 6 — blue || 1 || 0
| style="color:white; background:#20116d;"| 6,0
| style="color:white; background:#40318d;"| 6,1
| style="color:white; background:#6051ac;"| 6,2
| style="color:white; background:#8071cc;"| 6,3
| style="color:white; background:#9f90ec;"| 6,4
| style="color:black; background:#bfb0ff;"| 6,5*
| style="color:black; background:#dfd0ff;"| 6,6*
| style="color:black; background:#fff0ff;"| 6,7*
|-
| 7 — yellow || −1 || 0
| style="color:white; background:#202f00;"| 7,0*
| style="color:white; background:#404f00;"| 7,1*
| style="color:white; background:#606f13;"| 7,2
| style="color:white; background:#808e33;"| 7,3
| style="color:white; background:#9fae53;"| 7,4
| style="color:black; background:#bfce72;"| 7,5
| style="color:black; background:#dfee92;"| 7,6
| style="color:black; background:#ffffb2;"| 7,7*
|-
| 8 — orange || −0.7071068 || 0.7071068
| style="color:white; background:#4b1500;"| 8,0*
| style="color:white; background:#6b3409;"| 8,1
| style="color:white; background:#8b5429;"| 8,2
| style="color:white; background:#aa7449;"| 8,3
| style="color:white; background:#ca9469;"| 8,4
| style="color:black; background:#eab489;"| 8,5
| style="color:black; background:#ffd4a9;"| 8,6*
| style="color:black; background:#fff4c9;"| 8,7*
|-
| 9 — brown || −0.9238795 || 0.3826834
| style="color:white; background:#372200;"| 9,0*
| style="color:white; background:#574200;"| 9,1*
| style="color:white; background:#776219;"| 9,2
| style="color:white; background:#978139;"| 9,3
| style="color:white; background:#b7a158;"| 9,4
| style="color:black; background:#d7c178;"| 9,5
| style="color:black; background:#f6e198;"| 9,6
| style="color:black; background:#ffffb8;"| 9,7*
|-
| 10 — yellow-green || −0.9238795 || −0.3826834
| style="color:white; background:#093a00;"| 10,0*
| style="color:white; background:#285900;"| 10,1*
| style="color:white; background:#487919;"| 10,2
| style="color:white; background:#689939;"| 10,3
| style="color:white; background:#88b958;"| 10,4
| style="color:black; background:#a8d978;"| 10,5
| style="color:black; background:#c8f998;"| 10,6
| style="color:black; background:#e8ffb8;"| 10,7*
|-
| 11 — pink || 0 || 1
| style="color:white; background:#5d0120;"| 11,0
| style="color:white; background:#7d2140;"| 11,1
| style="color:white; background:#9c4160;"| 11,2
| style="color:white; background:#bc6180;"| 11,3
| style="color:white; background:#dc809f;"| 11,4
| style="color:black; background:#fca0bf;"| 11,5
| style="color:black; background:#ffc0df;"| 11,6*
| style="color:black; background:#ffe0ff;"| 11,7*
|-
| 12 — blue-green || 0 || −1
| style="color:white; background:#003f20;"| 12,0*
| style="color:white; background:#035f40;"| 12,1
| style="color:white; background:#237f60;"| 12,2
| style="color:white; background:#439e80;"| 12,3
| style="color:white; background:#63be9f;"| 12,4
| style="color:black; background:#82debf;"| 12,5
| style="color:black; background:#a2fedf;"| 12,6
| style="color:black; background:#c2ffff;"| 12,7*
|-
| 13 — light blue || 0.7071068 || −0.7071068
| style="color:white; background:#002b56;"| 13,0*
| style="color:white; background:#154b76;"| 13,1
| style="color:white; background:#356b96;"| 13,2
| style="color:white; background:#558bb6;"| 13,3
| style="color:white; background:#74abd6;"| 13,4
| style="color:black; background:#94cbf6;"| 13,5
| style="color:black; background:#b4eaff;"| 13,6*
| style="color:black; background:#d4ffff;"| 13,7*
|-
| 14 — dark blue || 0.9238795 || 0.3826834
| style="color:white; background:#370667;"| 14,0
| style="color:white; background:#572687;"| 14,1
| style="color:white; background:#7746a7;"| 14,2
| style="color:white; background:#9766c6;"| 14,3
| style="color:white; background:#b786e6;"| 14,4
| style="color:black; background:#d7a6ff;"| 14,5*
| style="color:black; background:#f6c5ff;"| 14,6*
| style="color:black; background:#ffe5ff;"| 14,7*
|-
| 15 — light green || −0.3826834 || −0.9238795
| style="color:white; background:#004202;"| 15,0*
| style="color:white; background:#086222;"| 15,1
| style="color:white; background:#278242;"| 15,2
| style="color:white; background:#47a262;"| 15,3
| style="color:white; background:#67c282;"| 15,4
| style="color:black; background:#87e2a2;"| 15,5
| style="color:black; background:#a7ffc2;"| 15,6*
| style="color:black; background:#c7ffe2;"| 15,7*
|}

Notes:
 Every composite color marked with an asterisk (*) is out of the RGB gamut.

Systems based on the Texas Instruments TMS9918 chip
The TMS9918 is a Video Display Controller (VDC) manufactured by Texas Instruments and introduced in 1979. The TMS9918 and its variants were used in the Memotech MTX, MSX, Sord M5, Tatung Einstein and Tomy Tutor.

The TMS9918 chip which uses a proprietary 15-color YUV composite video palette encoded palette plus a transparent color, intended to be used by the hardware sprites and simple video overlay. When used as an ordinary background color, it is rendered using the same color as the screen border.

{|
| 
| 
| style="vertical-align:top;" | 
|}

{|class="wikitable" style="border-style: none" border="1" cellpadding="5"
!| Number — name || Y || U || V || Number — name || Y || U || V
|-
| style="color:white; background:#000000;"| 0 — transparent || N/A || N/A || N/A
| style="color:white; background:#db6559;"| 8 — medium red || 0.53 || −0.377 || 0.868
|-
| style="color:white; background:#000000;"| 1 — black || 0 || 0 || 0
| style="color:black; background:#ff897d;"| 9 — (light red) || 0.67 || −0.377 || 0.868
|-
| style="color:white; background:#3eb849;"| 2 — medium green || 0.53 || −0.509 || −0.755
| style="color:black; background:#ccc35e;"| 10 — dark yellow || 0.73 || −0.755 || 0.189
|-
| style="color:black; background:#74d07d;"| 3 — light green || 0.67 || −0.377 || −0.566
| style="color:black; background:#ded087;"| 11 — light yellow || 0.80 || −0.566 || 0.189
|-
| style="color:white; background:#5955e0;"| 4 — dark blue || 0.40 || 1 || −0.132
| style="color:white; background:#3aa241;"| 12 — dark green || 0.47 || −0.453 || −0.642
|-
| style="color:white; background:#8076f1;"| 5 — light blue || 0.53 || 0.868 || −0.075
| style="color:white; background:#b766b5;"| 13 — magenta || 0.53 || 0.377 || 0.491
|-
| style="color:white; background:#b95e51;"| 6 — dark red || 0.47 || −0.321 || 0.679
| style="color:black; background:#cccccc;"| 14 — gray || 0.80 || 0 || 0
|-
| style="color:black; background:#65dbef;"| 7 — cyan || 0.73 || 0.434 || −0.887
| style="color:black; background:#ffffff;"| 15 — white || 1 || 0 || 0
|}

Note: The colors inside the parentheses are out of RGB gamut.

MSX
The MSX series has two graphic modes. The MSX BASIC Screen 3 mode is a low-resolution mode with 15 colors, in which every pixel can be any of the 15 available colors. 
Screen mode 2 is a 256×192 high-resolution mode with 15 colors, in which each of every eight consecutive pixels can only use 2 colors.

{|
| 15-color screen mode 3
| 15-color screen mode 2
|-
| 
| 
|}

Systems based on the Motorola 6847 chip
The Motorola 6847 is a video display generator (VDG) first introduced by Motorola and used in the TRS-80 Color Computer, Dragon 32/64, Laser 200, TRS-80 MC-10, NEC PC-6000 series, Acorn Atom, and the APF Imagination Machine, among others.

{|
| 
| 
|}

The following table shows the signal values used:

TRS-80 Color Computer

The TRS-80 Color Computer is capable of displaying text and graphics contained within a roughly square display matrix 256 pixels wide by 192 lines high. 
The hardware palette has 9 colors: black, green, yellow, blue, red, buff (almost-but-not-quite white), cyan, magenta, and orange.

All colors are available in text modes. In color modes (64×64, 128×64, 128×96, and 128×192) two four color palettes are available:
a green border with the colors green, yellow, red, and blue;
a white border with the colors white, cyan, magenta, and orange.

Display modes
{|
| Text Mode (9 colors)
| Color mode (4 colors)
| Color mode (alternate palette)
|-
|
|
|
|}

NEC PC-6000 series
Similar to other computers using the same video chip, the NEC PC-6000 series had four screen modes:
 32x16 characters with 4 colors 
 64x48 pixel graphics with 9 colors
 128x192 graphics with 4 colors 
 256x192 graphics with 2 colors (green, white)

Other palettes

Tandy Color Computer 3
The Tandy Color Computer 3 could display all of the modes of the Tandy Color Computer 1 and 2, except the Semigraphics modes, plus resolutions of 160, 256, 320, or 640 pixels wide by 192 to 225 lines from a palette of 64 colors. The 320 mode allowed 16 simultaneous colors, while the 640 mode allowed 4.

{|
| 
| 
|}

SAM Coupé

The 128 color master palette used by the SAM Coupé is produced via a unique method — it effectively contains 2 groups of 64 "RGB" colors of mildly different intensity, and ultimately derived from a 512 color space. The closest equivalent in more popular and well-known machines would be the Commodore-Amiga's 64-color "Extra Half-Brite" mode (with 32 explicitly set colors using 5 bitplanes, which are displayed with full or half brightness depending on the bit setting of a 6th plane).

Two bits are used for each of Red, Green and Blue and give a similar result to a normal 6-bit RGB palette (as seen with the IBM EGA or Sega Master System); the seventh bit encodes for "brightness", which has a similar but more subtle effect to the Spectrum, increasing the output of all three channels by half the intensity of the lower bits of the main six (in this way, it does make a genuine 128 colors — rather than 127 colors with "two blacks" and only a 7-level grayscale). 

The layout of the byte that encodes each color is complicated and appears like a Spectrum color nybble transferred to a full byte's width, and an extra RGB bit-triplet then prefixed to it, with the MSB left unused.

Resulting color palete:
{|
| 
| 
| 
| style="vertical-align:top;" | 
|}

{| class="wikitable" style="text-align: center;"
|+ SAM Coupé color palette and bitmask
|-
| style="color: white; background-color: #000000; width: 45pt;" | 0x00
| style="color: white; background-color: #000049; width: 45pt;" | 0x01
| style="color: white; background-color: #490000; width: 45pt;" | 0x02
| style="color: white; background-color: #490049; width: 45pt;" | 0x03
| style="color: white; background-color: #004900; width: 45pt;" | 0x04
| style="color: white; background-color: #004949; width: 45pt;" | 0x05
| style="color: white; background-color: #494900; width: 45pt;" | 0x06
| style="color: white; background-color: #494949; width: 45pt;" | 0x07
| style="color: white; background-color: #242424; width: 45pt;" | 0x08
| style="color: white; background-color: #24246d; width: 45pt;" | 0x09
| style="color: white; background-color: #6d2424; width: 45pt;" | 0x0A
| style="color: white; background-color: #6d246d; width: 45pt;" | 0x0B
| style="color: white; background-color: #246d24; width: 45pt;" | 0x0C
| style="color: white; background-color: #246d6d; width: 45pt;" | 0x0D
| style="color: white; background-color: #6d6d24; width: 45pt;" | 0x0E
| style="color: white; background-color: #6d6d6d; width: 45pt;" | 0x0F
|-
| style="color: white; background-color: #000092; width: 45pt;" | 0x10
| style="color: white; background-color: #0000db; width: 45pt;" | 0x11
| style="color: white; background-color: #490092; width: 45pt;" | 0x12
| style="color: white; background-color: #4900db; width: 45pt;" | 0x13
| style="color: white; background-color: #004992; width: 45pt;" | 0x14
| style="color: white; background-color: #0049db; width: 45pt;" | 0x15
| style="color: white; background-color: #494992; width: 45pt;" | 0x16
| style="color: white; background-color: #4949db; width: 45pt;" | 0x17
| style="color: white; background-color: #2424b6; width: 45pt;" | 0x18
| style="color: white; background-color: #2424ff; width: 45pt;" | 0x19
| style="color: white; background-color: #6d24b6; width: 45pt;" | 0x1A
| style="color: white; background-color: #6d24ff; width: 45pt;" | 0x1B
| style="color: white; background-color: #246db6; width: 45pt;" | 0x1C
| style="color: white; background-color: #246dff; width: 45pt;" | 0x1D
| style="color: white; background-color: #6d6db6; width: 45pt;" | 0x1E
| style="color: white; background-color: #6d6dff; width: 45pt;" | 0x1F
|-
| style="color: white; background-color: #920000; width: 45pt;" | 0x20
| style="color: white; background-color: #920049; width: 45pt;" | 0x21
| style="color: white; background-color: #db0000; width: 45pt;" | 0x22
| style="color: white; background-color: #db0049; width: 45pt;" | 0x23
| style="color: white; background-color: #924900; width: 45pt;" | 0x24
| style="color: white; background-color: #924949; width: 45pt;" | 0x25
| style="color: white; background-color: #db4900; width: 45pt;" | 0x26
| style="color: white; background-color: #db4949; width: 45pt;" | 0x27
| style="color: white; background-color: #b62424; width: 45pt;" | 0x28
| style="color: white; background-color: #b6246d; width: 45pt;" | 0x29
| style="color: white; background-color: #ff2424; width: 45pt;" | 0x2A
| style="color: white; background-color: #ff246d; width: 45pt;" | 0x2B
| style="color: white; background-color: #b66d24; width: 45pt;" | 0x2C
| style="color: white; background-color: #b66d6d; width: 45pt;" | 0x2D
| style="color: white; background-color: #ff6d24; width: 45pt;" | 0x2E
| style="color: black; background-color: #ff6d6d; width: 45pt;" | 0x2F
|-
| style="color: white; background-color: #920092; width: 45pt;" | 0x30
| style="color: white; background-color: #9200db; width: 45pt;" | 0x31
| style="color: white; background-color: #db0092; width: 45pt;" | 0x32
| style="color: white; background-color: #db00db; width: 45pt;" | 0x33
| style="color: white; background-color: #924992; width: 45pt;" | 0x34
| style="color: white; background-color: #9249db; width: 45pt;" | 0x35
| style="color: white; background-color: #db4992; width: 45pt;" | 0x36
| style="color: white; background-color: #db49db; width: 45pt;" | 0x37
| style="color: white; background-color: #b624b6; width: 45pt;" | 0x38
| style="color: white; background-color: #b624ff; width: 45pt;" | 0x39
| style="color: white; background-color: #ff24b6; width: 45pt;" | 0x3A
| style="color: white; background-color: #ff24ff; width: 45pt;" | 0x3B
| style="color: white; background-color: #b66db6; width: 45pt;" | 0x3C
| style="color: white; background-color: #b66dff; width: 45pt;" | 0x3D
| style="color: black; background-color: #ff6db6; width: 45pt;" | 0x3E
| style="color: black; background-color: #ff6dff; width: 45pt;" | 0x3F
|-
| style="color: white; background-color: #009200; width: 45pt;" | 0x40
| style="color: white; background-color: #009249; width: 45pt;" | 0x41
| style="color: white; background-color: #499200; width: 45pt;" | 0x42
| style="color: white; background-color: #499249; width: 45pt;" | 0x43
| style="color: white; background-color: #00db00; width: 45pt;" | 0x44
| style="color: white; background-color: #00db49; width: 45pt;" | 0x45
| style="color: white; background-color: #49db00; width: 45pt;" | 0x46
| style="color: black; background-color: #49db49; width: 45pt;" | 0x47
| style="color: white; background-color: #24b624; width: 45pt;" | 0x48
| style="color: white; background-color: #24b66d; width: 45pt;" | 0x49
| style="color: white; background-color: #6db624; width: 45pt;" | 0x4A
| style="color: black; background-color: #6db66d; width: 45pt;" | 0x4B
| style="color: black; background-color: #24ff24; width: 45pt;" | 0x4C
| style="color: black; background-color: #24ff6d; width: 45pt;" | 0x4D
| style="color: black; background-color: #6dff24; width: 45pt;" | 0x4E
| style="color: black; background-color: #6dff6d; width: 45pt;" | 0x4F
|-
| style="color: white; background-color: #009292; width: 45pt;" | 0x50
| style="color: white; background-color: #0092db; width: 45pt;" | 0x51
| style="color: white; background-color: #499292; width: 45pt;" | 0x52
| style="color: white; background-color: #4992db; width: 45pt;" | 0x53
| style="color: white; background-color: #00db92; width: 45pt;" | 0x54
| style="color: black; background-color: #00dbdb; width: 45pt;" | 0x55
| style="color: black; background-color: #49db92; width: 45pt;" | 0x56
| style="color: black; background-color: #49dbdb; width: 45pt;" | 0x57
| style="color: white; background-color: #24b6b6; width: 45pt;" | 0x58
| style="color: white; background-color: #24b6ff; width: 45pt;" | 0x59
| style="color: black; background-color: #6db6b6; width: 45pt;" | 0x5A
| style="color: black; background-color: #6db6ff; width: 45pt;" | 0x5B
| style="color: black; background-color: #24ffb6; width: 45pt;" | 0x5C
| style="color: black; background-color: #24ffff; width: 45pt;" | 0x5D
| style="color: black; background-color: #6dffb6; width: 45pt;" | 0x5E
| style="color: black; background-color: #6dffff; width: 45pt;" | 0x5F
|-
| style="color: white; background-color: #929200; width: 45pt;" | 0x60
| style="color: white; background-color: #929249; width: 45pt;" | 0x61
| style="color: black; background-color: #db9200; width: 45pt;" | 0x62
| style="color: black; background-color: #db9249; width: 45pt;" | 0x63
| style="color: black; background-color: #92db00; width: 45pt;" | 0x64
| style="color: black; background-color: #92db49; width: 45pt;" | 0x65
| style="color: black; background-color: #dbdb00; width: 45pt;" | 0x66
| style="color: black; background-color: #dbdb49; width: 45pt;" | 0x67
| style="color: black; background-color: #b6b624; width: 45pt;" | 0x68
| style="color: black; background-color: #b6b66d; width: 45pt;" | 0x69
| style="color: black; background-color: #ffb624; width: 45pt;" | 0x6A
| style="color: black; background-color: #ffb66d; width: 45pt;" | 0x6B
| style="color: black; background-color: #b6ff24; width: 45pt;" | 0x6C
| style="color: black; background-color: #b6ff6d; width: 45pt;" | 0x6D
| style="color: black; background-color: #ffff24; width: 45pt;" | 0x6E
| style="color: black; background-color: #ffff6d; width: 45pt;" | 0x6F
|-
| style="color: white; background-color: #929292; width: 45pt;" | 0x70
| style="color: black; background-color: #9292db; width: 45pt;" | 0x71
| style="color: black; background-color: #db9292; width: 45pt;" | 0x72
| style="color: black; background-color: #db92db; width: 45pt;" | 0x73
| style="color: black; background-color: #92db92; width: 45pt;" | 0x74
| style="color: black; background-color: #92dbdb; width: 45pt;" | 0x75
| style="color: black; background-color: #dbdb92; width: 45pt;" | 0x76
| style="color: black; background-color: #dbdbdb; width: 45pt;" | 0x77
| style="color: black; background-color: #b6b6b6; width: 45pt;" | 0x78
| style="color: black; background-color: #b6b6ff; width: 45pt;" | 0x79
| style="color: black; background-color: #ffb6b6; width: 45pt;" | 0x7A
| style="color: black; background-color: #ffb6ff; width: 45pt;" | 0x7B
| style="color: black; background-color: #b6ffb6; width: 45pt;" | 0x7C
| style="color: black; background-color: #b6ffff; width: 45pt;" | 0x7D
| style="color: black; background-color: #ffffb6; width: 45pt;" | 0x7E
| style="color: black; background-color: #ffffff; width: 45pt;" | 0x7F
|-
| style="color: white; background-color: #000049; width: 45pt;" colspan="2" | 0x01 (low blue)
| style="color: white; background-color: #490000; width: 45pt;" colspan="2" | 0x02 (low red)
| style="color: white; background-color: #004900; width: 45pt;" colspan="2" | 0x04 (low green)
| style="color: white; background-color: #242424; width: 45pt;" colspan="2" | 0x08 (brightness)
| style="color: white; background-color: #000092; width: 45pt;" colspan="2" | 0x10 (high blue)
| style="color: white; background-color: #920000; width: 45pt;" colspan="2" | 0x20 (high red)
| style="color: white; background-color: #009200; width: 45pt;" colspan="2" | 0x40 (high green)
|}

Side-by-side comparison 

Since there are many 8-bit computers to compare, a comparison table has been compiled to make comparing the systems easier.

See also
 List of color palettes
 List of monochrome and RGB color formats
 List of software palettes
 List of video game console palettes
 List of 16-bit computer hardware palettes
 Palette (computing)
 Indexed color
 Color Lookup Table
 Color depth

References

Computer graphics
Color depths
Computing output devices